= Geode (processor) =

Series of x86-compatible processor

NSC Geode
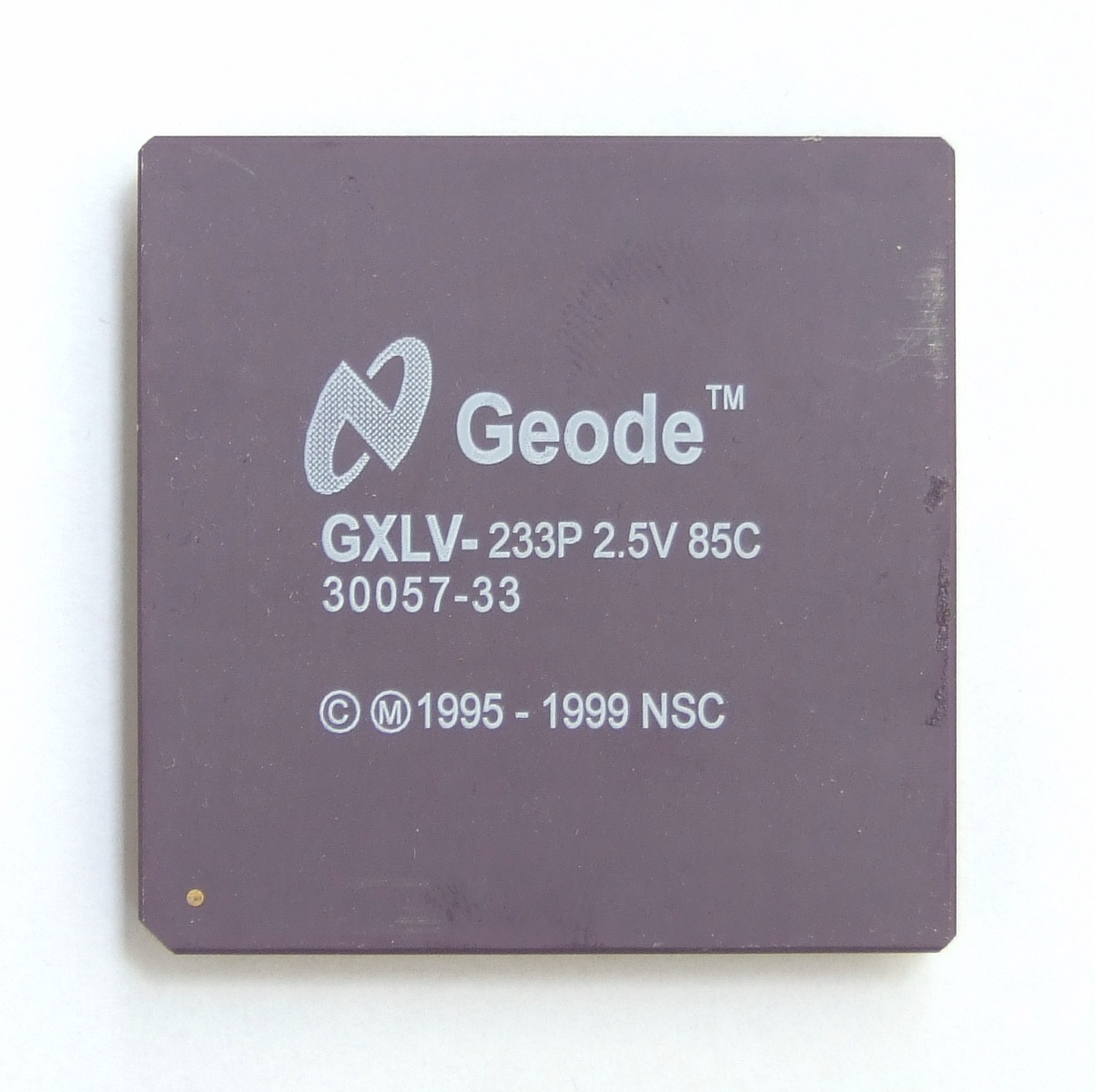
- NSC Geode GXLV 233 MHz

General information
- Launched: 1999
- Common manufacturer: National Semiconductor
- CPUID code: 540h

Performance
- Max. CPU clock rate: 180 MHz to 400 MHz
- FSB speeds: 30 MHz to 33 MHz

Physical specifications
- Cores: 1
- Package: BGA
- Sockets: Socket A; BGA 481; BGA 396

Cache
- L1 cache: 16 KiB unified (GXm/GXLV/GX1), 16 KiB instruction + 16 KiB data (GX2)

Architecture and classification
- Technology node: 0.15 μm to 0.35 μm
- Microarchitecture: 5x86
- Instruction set: IA-32
- Extensions: MMX, 3DNow! (GX2)

History
- Predecessor: Cyrix MediaGX

Geode is a series of x86-compatible system-on-a-chip (SoC) microprocessors and I/O companions produced by AMD that was targeted at the embedded computing market.

The series was originally launched by National Semiconductor as the Geode family in 1999. The original Geode processor core itself is derived from the Cyrix MediaGX platform, which was acquired in National's merger with Cyrix in 1997. AMD bought the Geode business from National in August 2003 to augment its existing line of embedded x86 processor products. Before acquiring Geode, AMD marketed the AMD Élan, a family of 32-bit embedded SoCs based on their own Am386, Am486 and Am586 microprocessors. All of these products have been backed with a long-term supply guarantee to meet the needs of embedded processors. However, after acquiring Geode, the product was suddenly discontinued.

AMD expanded the Geode series to two classes of processor: the MediaGX-derived Geode GX and LX, and the modern Athlon-derived Geode NX.

Geode processors are optimized for low power consumption and low cost while still remaining compatible with software written for the x86 platform. The MediaGX-derived processors lack modern features such as SSE and a large on-die L1 cache but these are offered on the more recent Athlon-derived Geode NX. Geode processors tightly integrate some of the functions normally provided by a separate chipset, such as the northbridge. Whilst the processor family is best suited for thin client, set top box and embedded computing applications, it can be found in unusual applications such as the Nao robot and the Win Enterprise IP-PBX.

The One Laptop per Child project used the GX series Geode processor in OLPC XO-1 prototypes, but moved to the Geode LX for production. The Linutop (rebranded Artec ThinCan DBE61C or rebranded FIC ION603A) is also based on the Geode LX. 3Com Audrey was powered by a 200 MHz Geode GX1.

The SCxxxx range of Geode devices are a single-chip version, comparable to the SiS 552, VIA CoreFusion or Intel's Tolapai, which integrate the CPU, memory controller, graphics and I/O devices into one package. Single processor boards based on these processors are manufactured by Artec Group, PC Engines (WRAP), Soekris, and Win Enterprises.

AMD discontinued all Geode processors in 2019.

== National Semiconductor Geode ==
=== Geode GXm ===
Rebranded Cyrix MediaGXm. Returns "CyrixInstead" on CPUID.

- 0.35 μm four-layer metal CMOS
- MMX instructions
- Core speed: 180, 200, 233, 266 MHz
- 3.3 V I/O, 2.9 V core
- 16 KB four-way set associative write-back unified (I&D) L1 cache, 2 or 4 KB of which can be reserved as I/O scratchpad RAM for use by the integrated graphics core (e.g. for bitblits).
- 30–33 MHz PCI bus interconnect with CPU bus
- 64-bit SDRAM interface
- Fully static design
- CS5530 companion chip (implements sound and video functions)
- VSA architecture
- 1280×1024×8 or 1024×768×16 display

=== Geode GXLV ===
- Die-shrunk GXm
- 0.25 μm four-layer metal CMOS
- Core speed: 166, 180, 200, 233, 266 MHz
- 3.3 V I/O, 2.2, 2.5, 2.9 V core
- Typical power: 1.0 W at 2.2 V/166 MHz, 2.5 W at 2.9 V/266 MHz

=== Geode GX1 ===
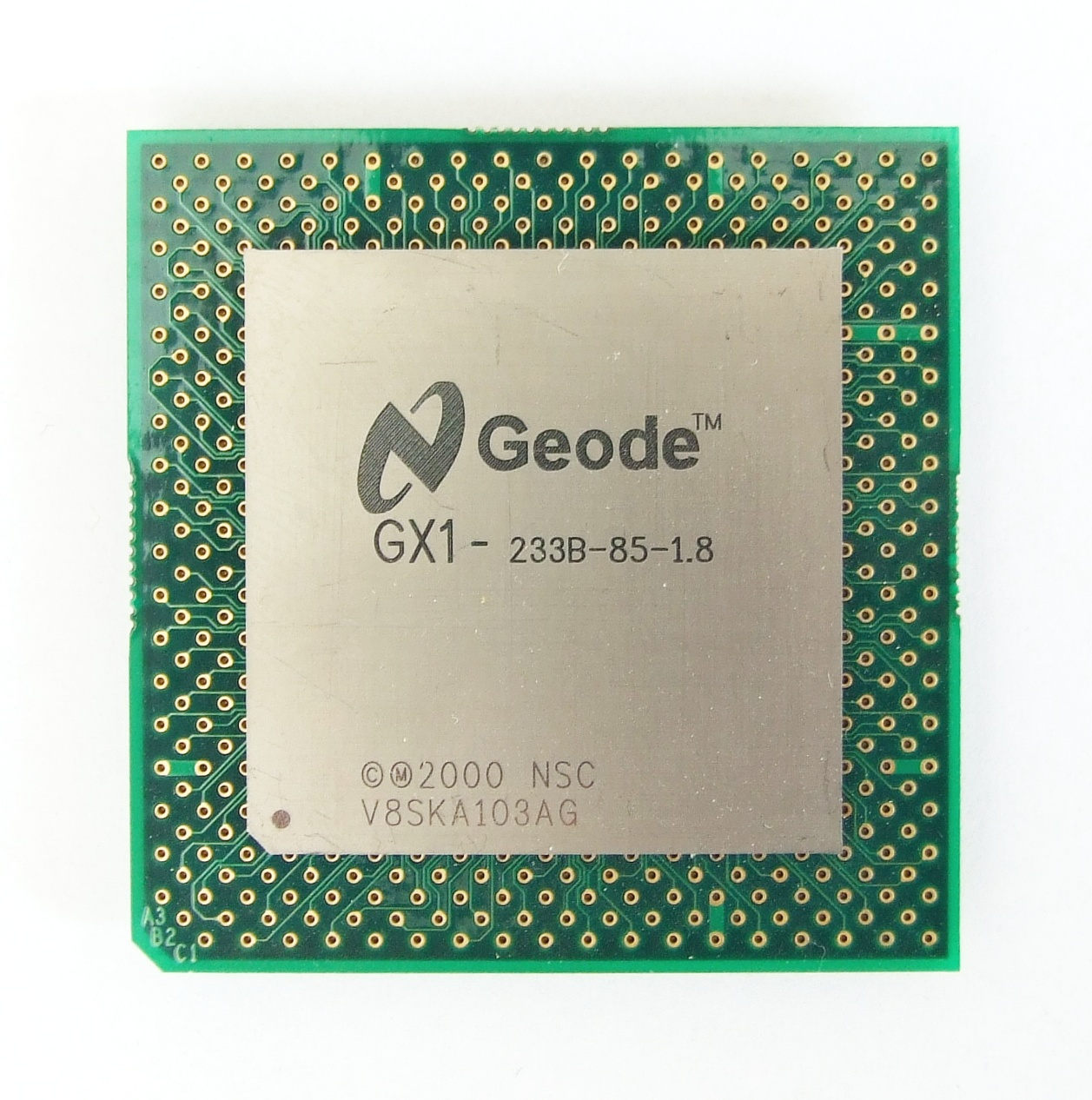
National Semiconductor Geode GX1, 233 MHz

- Die-shrunk GXLV
- 0.18 μm four-layer metal CMOS
- Core speed: 200, 233, 266, 300, 333 MHz
- 3.3 V I/O, 1.8, 2.0, 2.2 V core
- Typical power: 0.8 W at 1.8 V/200 MHz, 1.4 W at 2.2 V/333 MHz
- 64-bit SDRAM interface, up to 111 MHz
- CS5530A companion chip
- 60 Hz VGA refresh rate

National Semiconductor/AMD SC1100 is based on the Geode GX1 core and the CS5530 support chip.

=== Geode GX2 ===
Announced by National Semiconductor Corporation, October 2001 at Microprocessor Forum. First demonstration at COMPUTEX Taiwan, June 2002.

- 0.15 μm process technology
- MMX and 3DNow! instructions
- 16 KB Instruction and 16 KB Data L1 cache
- GeodeLink architecture, 6 GB/s on-chip bandwidth, up to 2 GB/s memory bandwidth
- Integrated 64-bit PC133 SDRAM and DDR266 controller
- Clockrate: 266, 333, and 400 MHz
- 33 MHz PCI bus interconnect with CPU bus
- 3 PCI masters supported
- 1600×1200 24-bit display with video scaling
- CRT DACs and an UMA DSTN/TFT controller
- Geode CS5535 or CS5536 companion chip

=== Geode SCxx00 Series ===
Developed by National Tel Aviv (NSTA) based on IP from Longmont and other sources.

Applications:

- The SC3200 was used in the Tatung TWN-5213 CU.

== AMD Geode ==
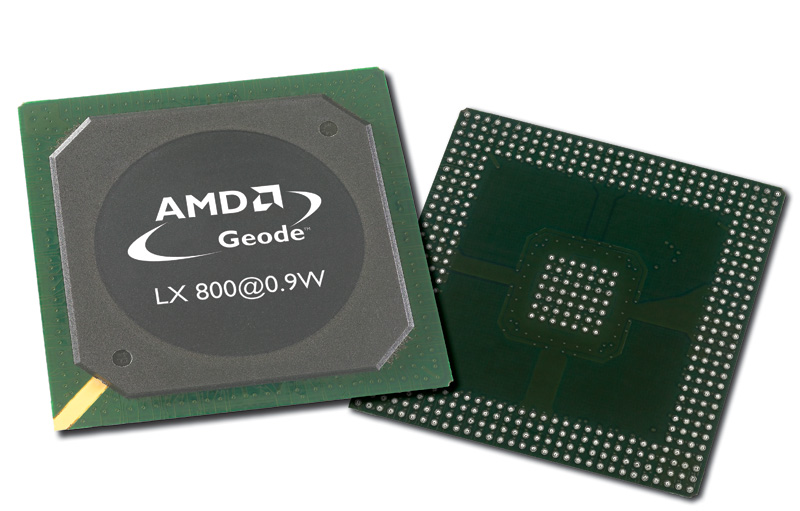
AMD Geode LX 800 (500 MHz, 0.9 W) processor

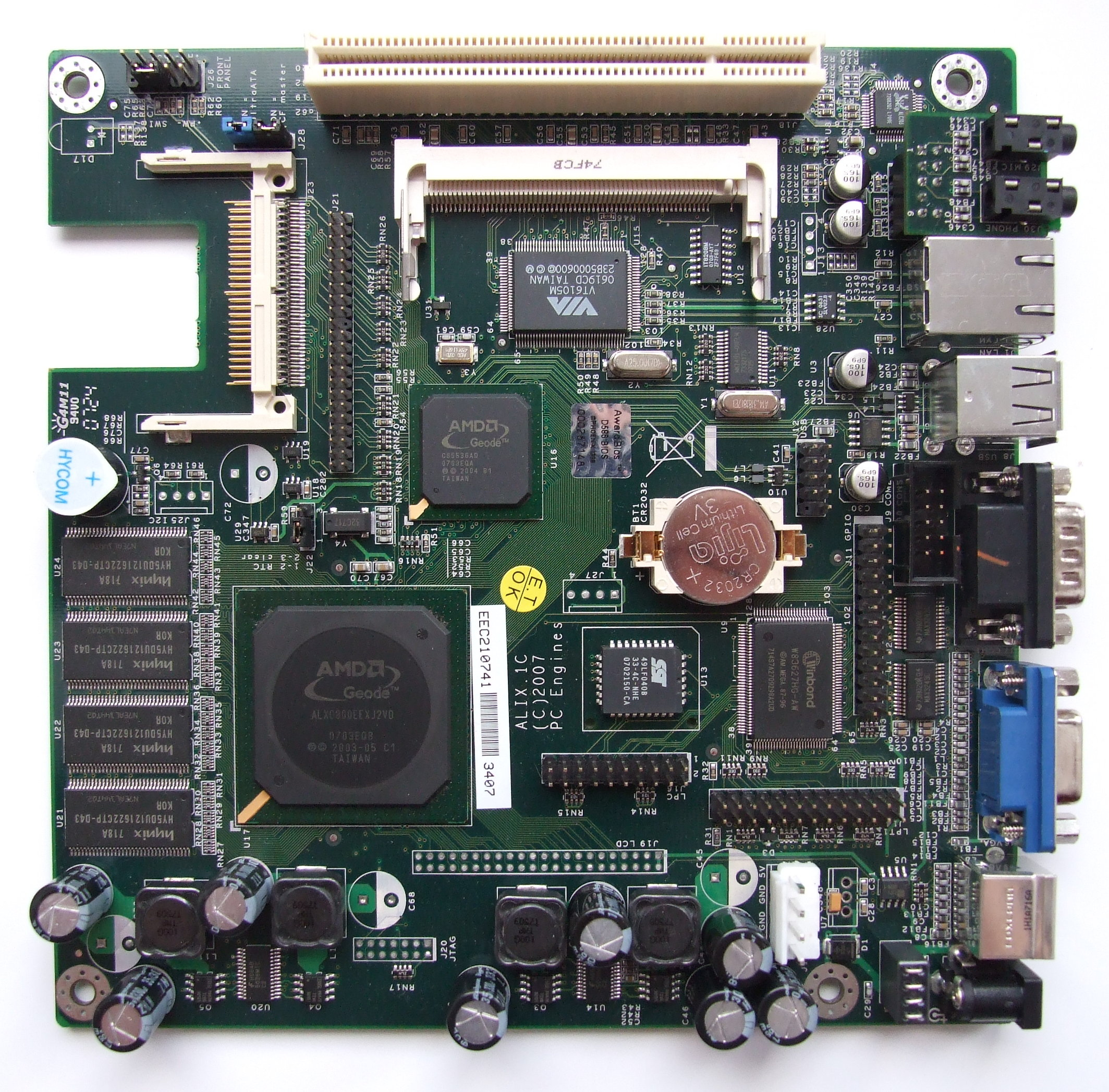
Alix.1C Mini-ITX embedded board with AMD Geode LX 800 together with Compact Flash, miniPCI and PCI slots, 44-pin IDE interface and 256 MB RAM

In 2002, AMD introduced the Geode GX series, which was a re-branding of the National Semiconductor GX2. This was quickly followed by the Geode LX, running up to 600 MHz. LX brought many improvements, such as higher-speed DDR, a re-designed instruction pipe, a more powerful display controller, an increased memory caches from 16 to 64 KB and a 128-bit AES encryption module. The upgrade from the CS5535 I/O Companion to the CS5536 brought higher-speed USB.

Geode GX and LX processors are typically found in devices such as thin clients and industrial control systems. However, they came under competitive pressure from VIA on the x86 side, and ARM processors from various vendors taking much of the low-end business.

Because of the relative performance, albeit higher PPW, of the GX and LX core design, AMD introduced the Geode NX, which is an embedded version of the Athlon processor, K7. Geode NX uses the Thoroughbred core and is quite similar to the Athlon XP-M that use this core. The Geode NX includes 256 KB of level 2 cache, and runs fanless at up to 1 GHz in the NX1500@6 W version. The NX2001 part runs at 1.8 GHz, the NX1750 part runs at 1.4 GHz, and the NX1250 runs at 667 MHz.

The Geode NX, with its strong FPU, is particularly suited for embedded devices with graphical performance requirements, such as information kiosks and casino gaming machines, such as video slots.

However, it was reported that the specific design team for Geode processors in Longmont, Colorado, has been closed, and 75 employees are being relocated to the new development facility in Fort Collins, Colorado. It is expected that the Geode line of processors will be updated less frequently due to the closure of the Geode design center.

In 2009, comments by AMD indicated that there are no plans for any future microarchitecture upgrades to the processor and that there will be no successor; however, the processors will still be available with the planned availability of the Geode LX extending through 2015. In 2016 AMD updated the product roadmap announcing extension of last time buy and shipment for the LX series to 2019. In early 2018 hardware manufacturer congatec announced an agreement with AMD for a further extension of availability of congatec's Geode based platforms.

=== Geode GX ===
Model	Clock rate
Model	Core (MHz)
Geode GX 466@0.9 W	333
Geode GX 500@0.9 W	366
Geode GX 533@0.9 W	400

=== Geode LX ===
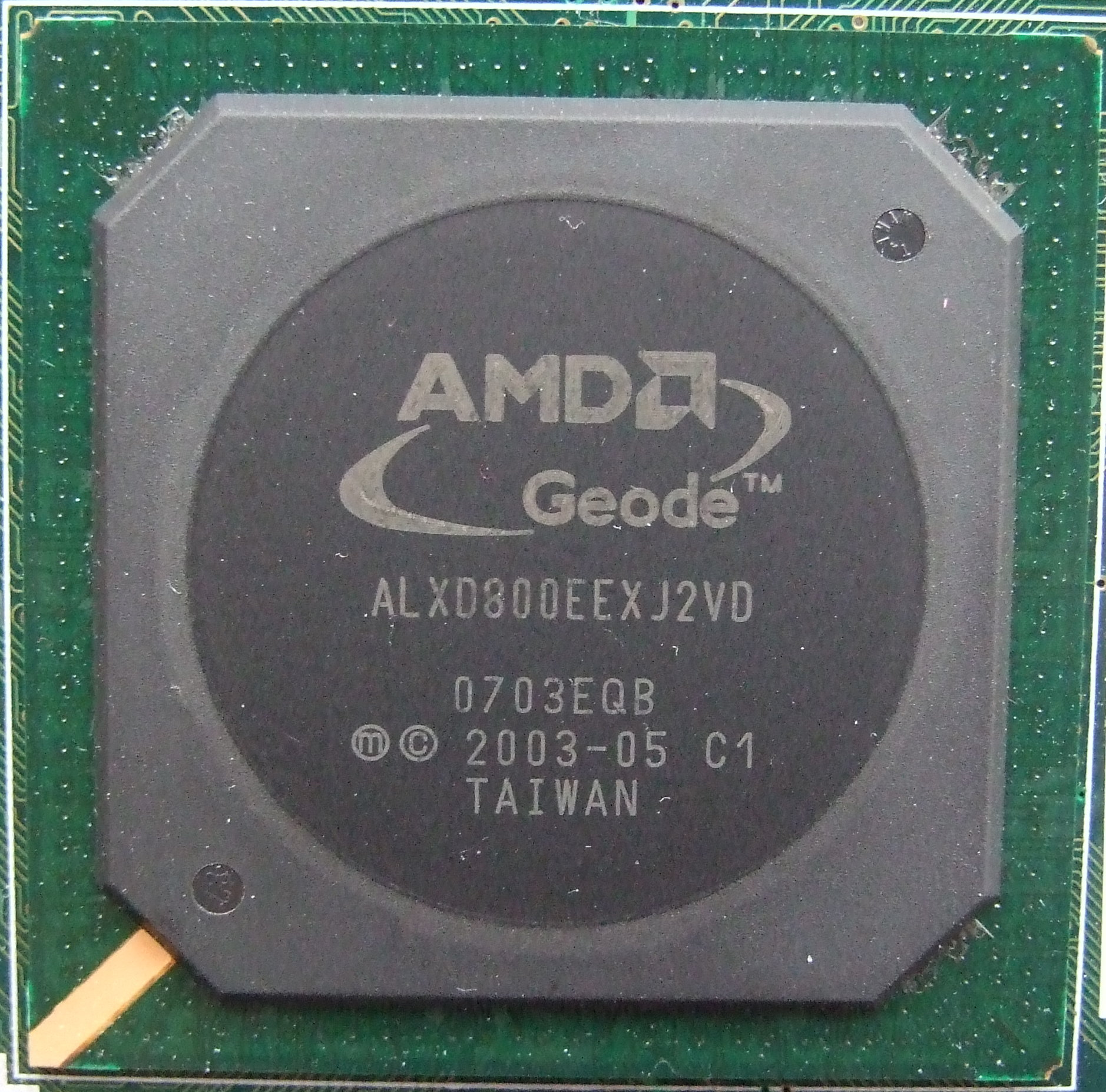
AMD Geode LX 800 (500 MHz) CPU

Model	Clock rate	Power consumption	TDP
Model	Core (MHz)	W	
Geode LX 600@0.7 W	366	1.2	2.8
Geode LX 700@0.8 W	433	1.3	3.1
Geode LX 800@0.9 W	500	1.8	3.6
Geode LX 900@1.5 W	600	2.6	5.1

Features:

- Low power
- Full x86 compatibility
- Processor functional blocks:
  - CPU core
  - GeodeLink Control Processor
  - GeodeLink Interface Units
  - GeodeLink Memory Controller
  - Graphics Processor
  - Display Controller
  - Video Processor
  - Video Input Port
  - GeodeLink PCI Bridge
  - Security Block
    - 128-bit Advanced Encryption Standard (AES) – (CBC/ECB)
    - True Random Number Generator

Specification:

- Processor frequency up to 600 MHz (LX900), 500 MHz (LX800) and 433 MHz (LX700)
- Power management: ACPI, lower power, wakeup on SMI/INTR
- 64K Instruction / 64K Data L1 cache and 128K L2 cache
- Split Instruction/Data cache/TLB
- DDR Memory 400 MHz (LX 800), 333 MHz (LX 700)
- Integrated FPU with MMX and 3DNow!
- 9 GB/s internal GeodeLink Interface Unit (GLIU)
- Simultaneous, high-res CRT and TFT (High and standard definition). VESA 1.1 and 2.0 VIP/VDA support.
- Manufactured at a 0.13 micrometre process
- 481-terminal PBGA (Plastic Ball grid array)
- GeodeLink active hardware power management

Applications:

- OLPC XO-1

=== Geode NX ===
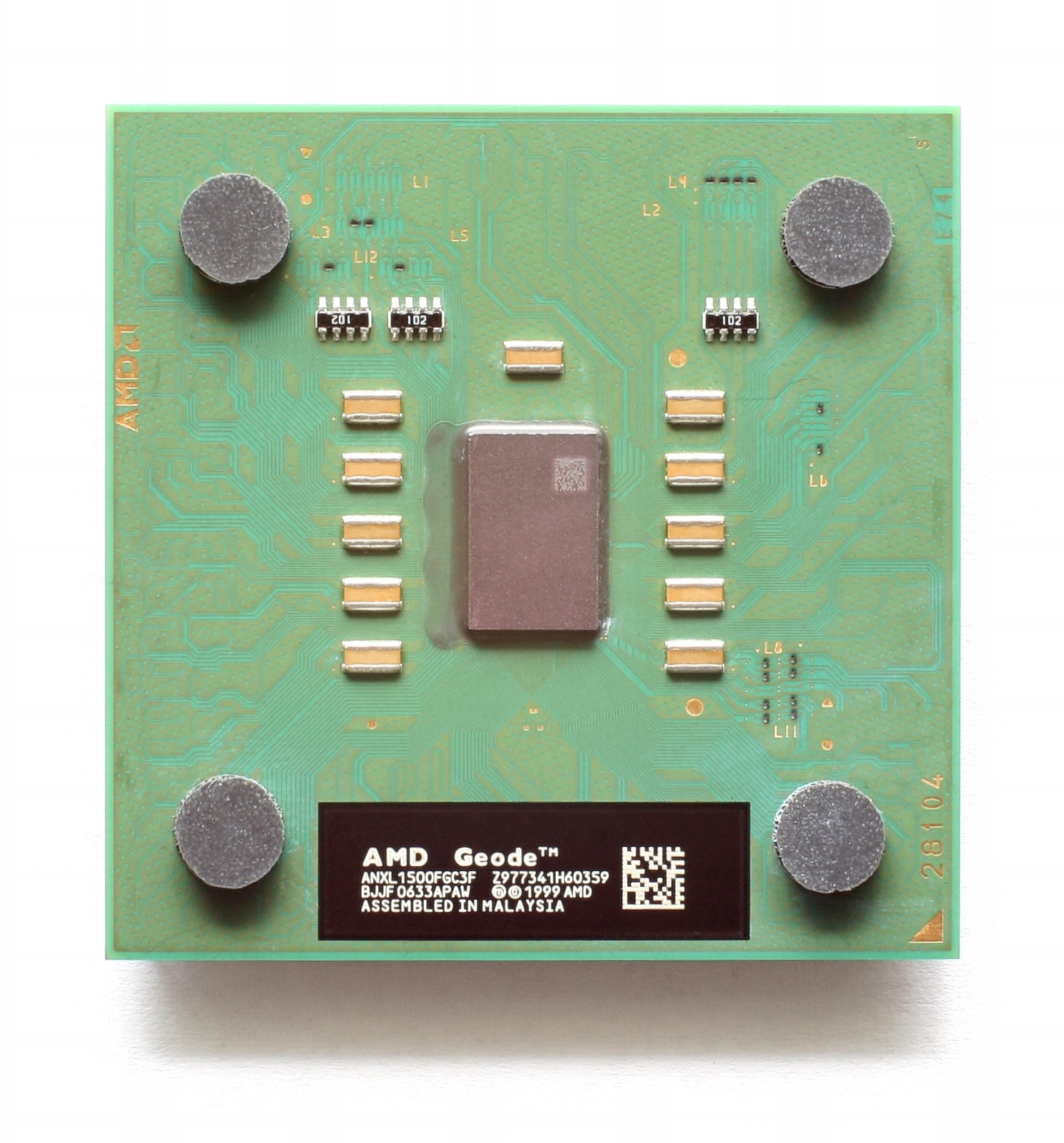
AMD Geode NX 1500

Model	Fab (nm)	Clock rate		CPU cache (KB)		Power consumption	TDP	Core operating voltage (V)
Model	Fab (nm)	Core (MHz)	FSB (MHz)	L1	L2	W		Core operating voltage (V)
Geode NX 1250@6 W	130	667	133	128	256	6	9	1.00
Geode NX 1500@6 W	130	1000	133	128	256	6	9	1.10
Geode NX 1750@14 W	130	1400	133	128	256	14	25	1.25
Geode NX 2000	130	1800	133	128	256	?	?	1.40

Features:

- 7th generation core (based on Mobile Athlon XP-M)
- Power management: AMD PowerNow!, ACPI 1.0b and ACPI 2.0
- 3DNow!, MMX and SSE instruction sets
- 0.13 μm (130 nm) fabrication process
- Pin compatibility between all NX family processors
- OS support: Linux, Windows CE, Windows XP
- Compatible with Socket A motherboards

==== Geode NX 2001 ====
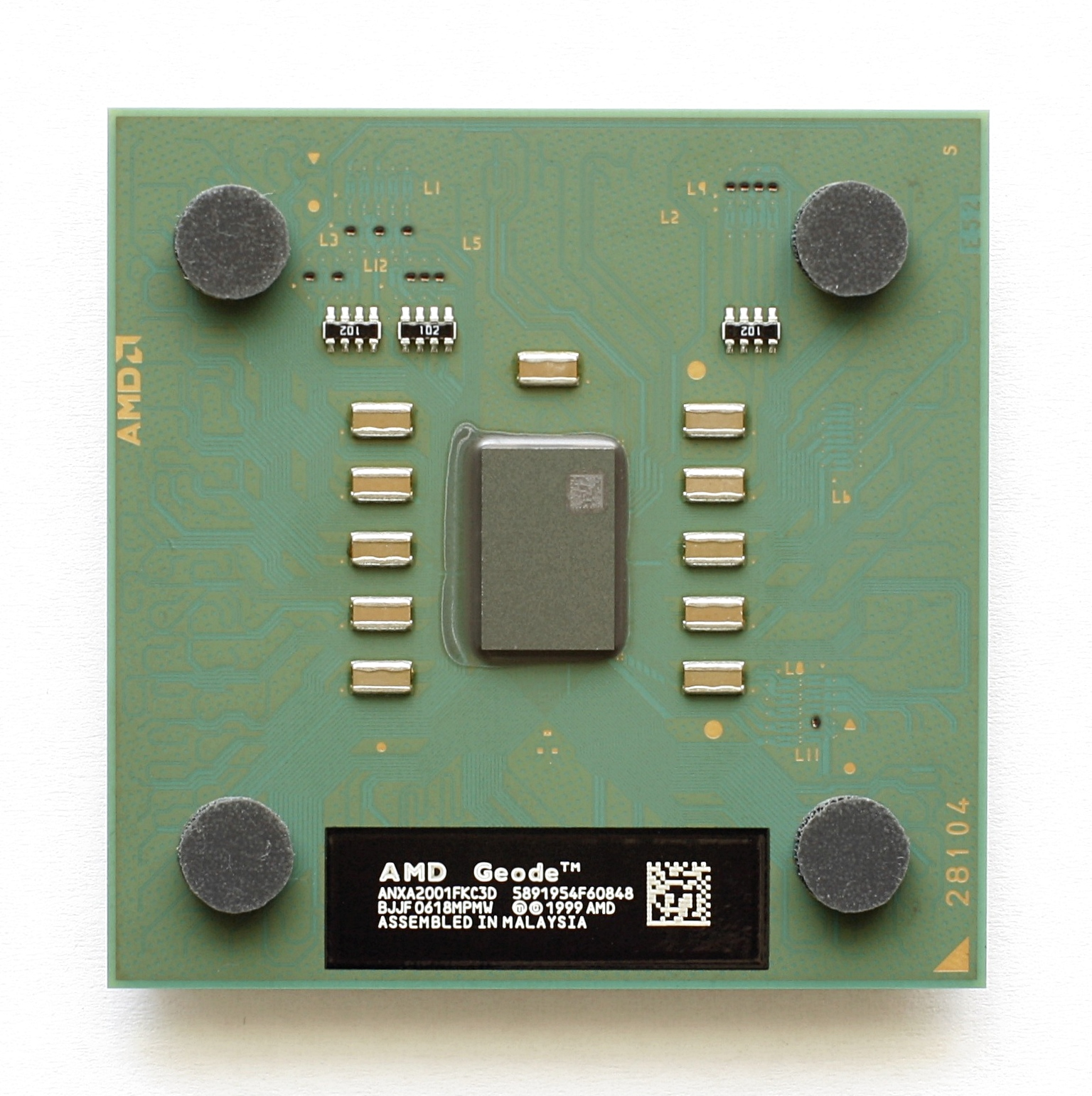
Geode NX 2001

In 2007, there was a Geode NX 2001 model on sale, which was a relabelled Athlon XP 2200+ Thoroughbred. The processors, with part numbers AANXA2001FKC3G or ANXA2001FKC3D, their specifications are 1.8 GHz clock speed, and 1.65 volt core operating voltage. The power consumption is 62.8 Watt. There are no official references to this processor except officials explaining that the batch of CPUs were "being shipped to specific customers", though it is clear it is a desktop Athlon XP CPU core instead of the Mobile Athlon XP-M derived Thoroughbred cores of the other Geode NX CPUs, and thus doesn't feature embedded application specific thermal envelope, power consumption and power management features. This kind of "badge engineering" of a particular CPU to accommodate a request for a desktop class chip from an OEM which merely wants to maintain brand recognition and association with the GeodeNX CPUs in its products, but the actual end-product application doesn't necessitate the advanced power and thermal optimization of the GeodeNX CPU's, is understandable, as re-labeling a part in a product catalog, is practically free and the processors do share the same CPU socket (Socket A).

== Chipsets for Geode ==
1. NSC Geode CS5530A Southbridge for Geode GX1.
2. NSC/AMD Geode CS5535 Southbridge for Geode GX(2) and Geode LX (USB 1.1). Integrates four USB ports, one ATA-66 UDMA controller, one Infrared communication port, one AC'97 controller, one SMBUS controller, one LPC port, as well as GPIO, Power Management, and legacy functional blocks.
3. AMD Geode CS5536 Southbridge for Geode GX and Geode LX (USB 2.0). Power consumption: 1.9 W (433 MHz) and 2.4 W (500 MHz). This chipset is also used on PowerPC board (Amy'05).
4. Geode NX processors are "100 percent socket and chipset compatible" with AMD's Socket A Athlon XP processors: SIS741CX Northbridge and SIS 964 Southbridge, VIA KM400 Northbridge and VIA VT8235 Southbridge, VIA KM400A Northbridge and VIA VT8237R Southbridge and other Socket A chipsets.

== Military usage ==
During the war in Ukraine, second-hand processors are used by the Russian defence industry as components of weapons systems – for example, 3M-14 Kalibr and Kh-47M2 Kinzhal missiles.

== See also ==
- Cyrix 5x86
- Wireless Router Application Platform – WRAP
- 3Com Audrey
- Koolu
- Linutop
- Netbook
- MediaGX
- Sony eVilla
- ThinCan
- Virgin Webplayer
- PC/104
- Intel Atom
- VIA Nano
