= Cyrix =

American microprocessor developer

Cyrix Corporation
- Type: Public company
- Traded as: Nasdaq: CYRX
- Industry: Semiconductors
- Founded: 1988; 38 years ago
- Founders: Jerry Rogers; Tom Brightman
- Defunct: November 11, 1997; 29 years ago
- Fate: Merged and dissolved
- Successor: Sold to National Semiconductor (later to VIA Technologies); assets sold to Advanced Micro Devices
- Headquarters: Richardson, Texas, U.S.
- Number of employees: c. 300
- Website: cyrix.com at the Wayback Machine (archived 1997-01-10)

Cyrix Corporation was a microprocessor developer that was founded in 1988 in Richardson, Texas, as a specialist supplier of floating point units for 286 and 386 microprocessors. The company was founded by Tom Brightman and Jerry Rogers. Jerry Rogers was also serving as the company Chief Executive Officer and president up until December 9, 1996, when he stepped down from this role, but remained on the Board of Directors.

In 1992, Cyrix introduced its own i386 compatible processors, the 486SLC and 486DLC. These had higher performance than the Intel parts, but a lower price. They were primarily marketed to users looking to upgrade existing machines. Their release sparked a lengthy series of lawsuits with Intel while their foundry partner IBM was releasing the same designs under their own branding.

The combination of these events led Cyrix to begin losing money, and the company merged with National Semiconductor on 11 November 1997. National released Cyrix's latest designs under the MediaGX name and then an updated version as Geode in 1999. National sold the line to AMD in August 2003 where it was known as Geode. The line was discontinued in 2019.

== History ==
At the end of March in 1992, the Cyrix Cx486SLC was released. It was a x86 microprocessor that was pin-compatible with the 386SX and made for notebook computer applications. Following up shortly after in June 1992, the Cx486DLC was released, a desktop version of the SLC that was pin-compatible with the 386DX.

== Products ==
=== Cyrix FasMath coprocessors ===
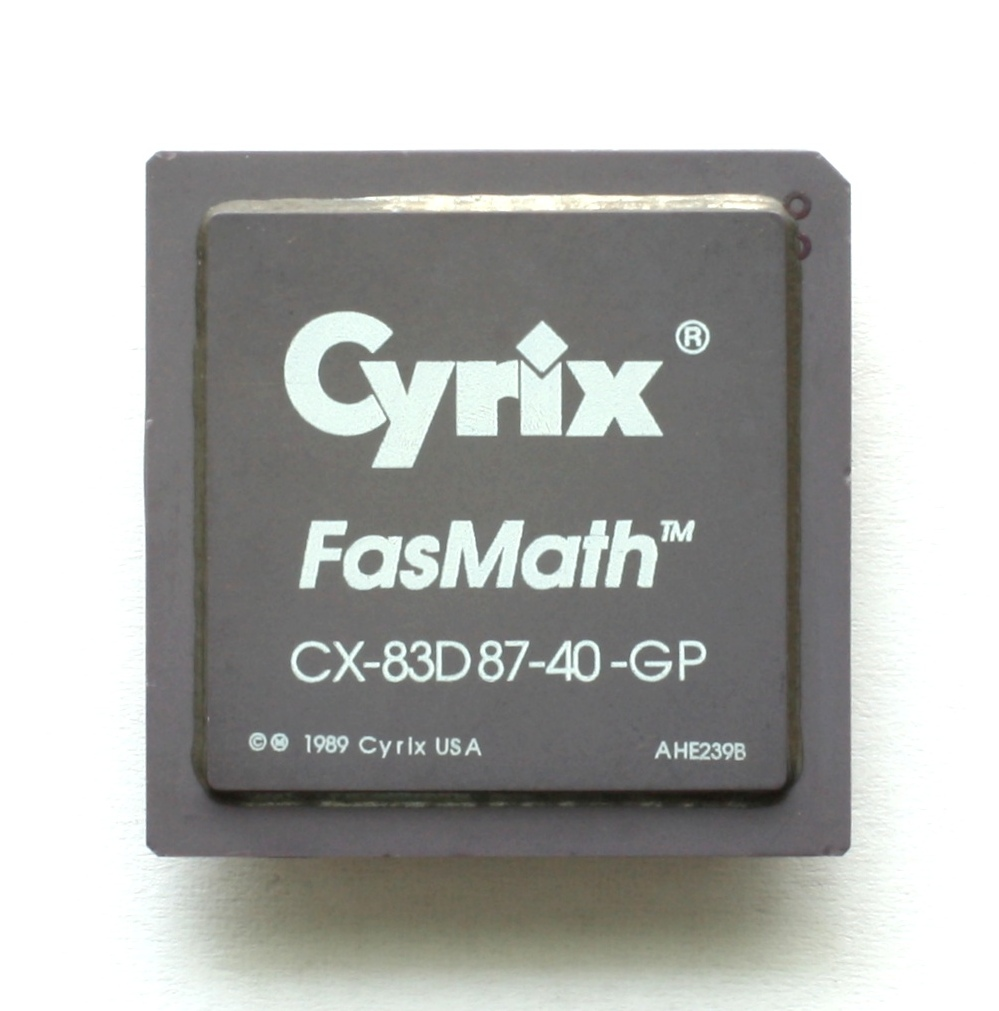
Cyrix FasMath

The first Cyrix product for the personal computer market was a x87 compatible FPU coprocessor. The Cyrix FasMath 83D87 and 83S87 were introduced in November 1989. The 83D87 was pin compatible with the Intel 80387, while the 83S87 was pin compatible with the 80387SX. Both provided up to 50% more performance, and additionally they had lower power consumption when idle, due to a low power operation. Upon release the 83S87 cost $506 for a 16-MHz version and $556 for a 20-MHz version. The Cyrix FasMath 82S87, a 80287-compatible chip, was developed from the Cyrix 83D87 and has been available since 1991.

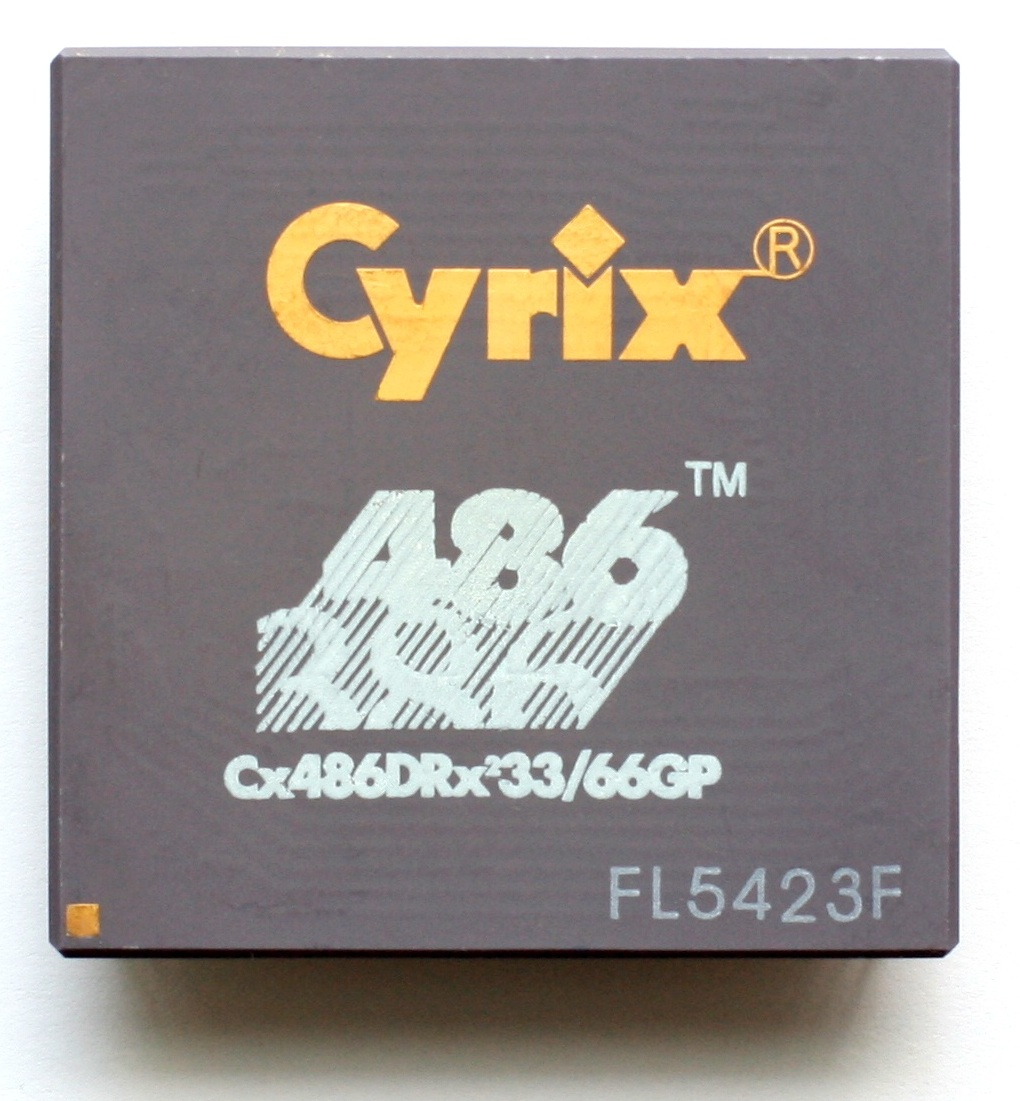
Cyrix Cx486DRx² microprocessor

=== 486 ===
Its early CPU products included the 486SLC and 486DLC, released in 1992, which, despite their names, were pin-compatible with the 386SX and DX, respectively. While they added an on-chip L1 cache and the 486 instruction set, performance-wise, they were somewhere between the 386 and the 486. The chips were mostly used as upgrades by end users looking to improve performance of an aging 386 and especially by dealers, who by changing the CPU could turn slow-selling 386 boards into budget 486 boards. The chips were widely criticized in product reviews for not offering the performance suggested by their names, and for the confusion caused by their naming similarity with Intel's SL line and IBM's SLC line of CPUs, neither of which was related to Cyrix's SLC. The chips did see use in very low-cost PC clones and in laptops.

Cyrix would later release the Cyrix 486SRX2 and 486DRX2, which were essentially clock-doubled versions of the SLC and DLC, marketed exclusively to consumers as 386-to-486 upgrades. Unlike the SLC/DLC, these chips contained internal cache coherency circuitry which made the chips compatible with older 386 motherboards that did not have extra circuitry or BIOS routines to keep the cache current.

Eventually, Cyrix was able to release the Cyrix Cx486S and later Cyrix Cx486DX that was pin-compatible with its Intel 486 counterparts. However, the chips were later to market than AMD's 486s and benchmarked slightly slower than AMD and Intel counterparts, which relegated them to the budget and upgrade market. While AMD had been able to sell some of its 486s to large OEMs, notably Acer and Compaq, Cyrix had not. The Cyrix chips did gain some following with upgraders, as their 50-, 66-, and 80 MHz 486 CPUs ran at 5 V, rather than the 3.3 V used by AMD, making the Cyrix chips usable as upgrades in early 486 motherboards.

=== Cyrix 5x86 ===
In 1995, with its Pentium clone not yet ready to ship, Cyrix repeated its own history and released the Cyrix Cx5x86 (M1sc), which plugged into a 3.3V 486 socket, ran at 80, 100, 120, or 133 MHz, and yielded performance comparable to that of a Pentium running at 75 MHz. Cyrix 5x86 (M1sc) was a cost-reduced version of the flagship 6x86 (M1). Like Intel's Pentium Overdrive, the Cyrix 5x86 used a 32-bit external data bus. While AMD's Am5x86 was little more than a clock-quadrupled 486 with a new name, Cyrix's 5x86 implemented some Pentium-like features.

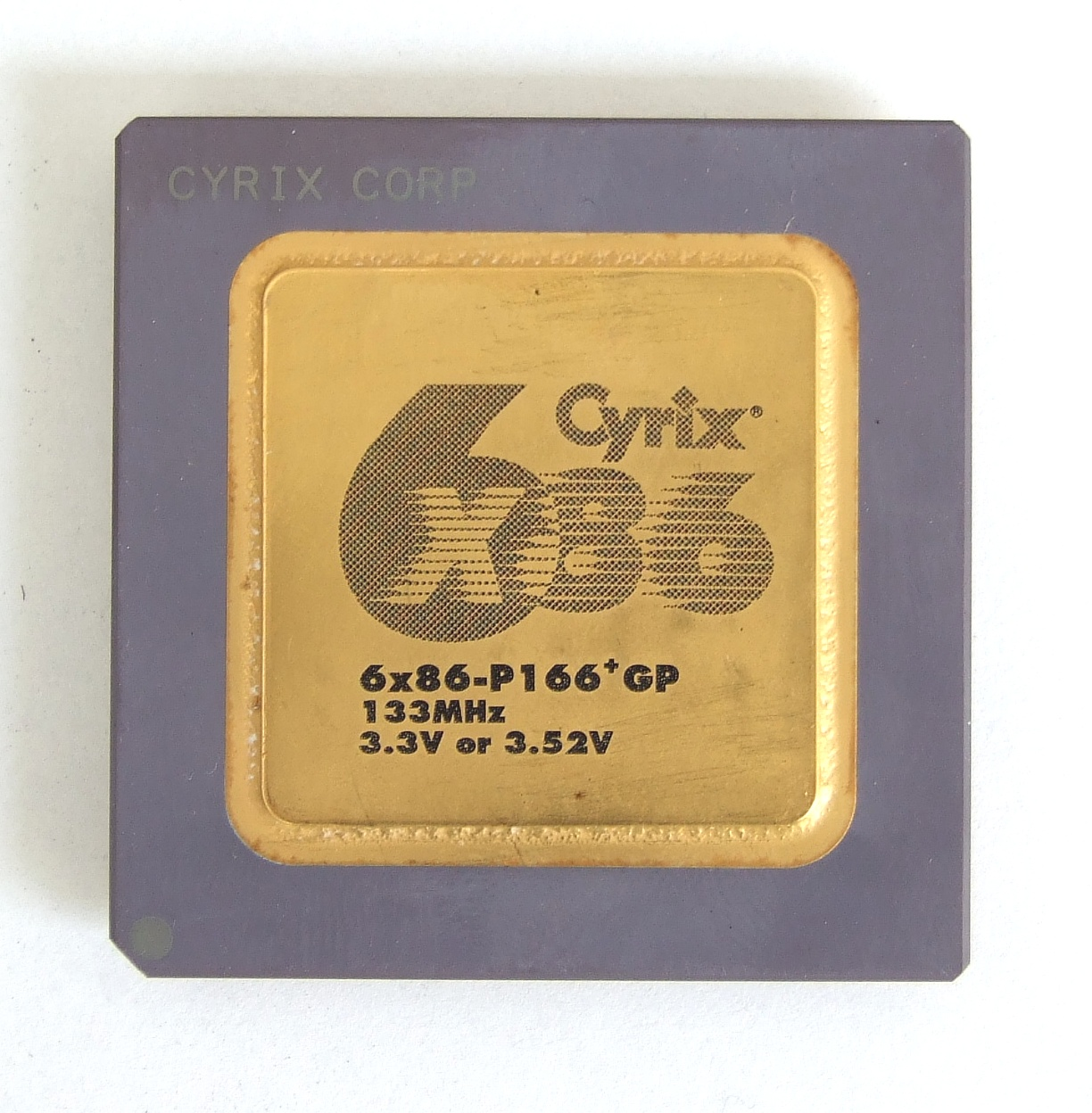
Cyrix 6x86-P166

=== Cyrix 6x86 ===
Later in 1995, Cyrix released its best-known chip, the Cyrix 6x86 (M1). This processor continued the Cyrix tradition of making faster replacements for Intel designed sockets. However, the 6x86 was the star performer in the range, giving a claimed performance boost over the Intel "equivalent". 6x86 processors were given names such as P166+ indicating a performance better than a Pentium 166 MHz processor. In fact, the 6x86 processor was clocked at a significantly lower speed than the Pentium counterpart it outperformed. Initially, Cyrix tried to charge a premium for the Cyrix-claimed extra performance, but the 6x86's math coprocessor was not as fast as that in the Intel Pentium. The main difference was not one of actual computing performance on the coprocessor, but a lack of instruction pipelining. Due to the increasing popularity of first-person 3D games, Cyrix was forced to lower its prices. While the 6x86 quickly gained a following among computer enthusiasts and independent computer shops, unlike AMD, its chips had yet to be used by a major OEM customer. The game in question causing most problems for performance was Id Software's Quake. Unlike previous 3D games, Quake used the pipelined Pentium FPU to do perspective correction calculations in the background while texture mapping, effectively doing two tasks at once. This would not have been a big problem for the 6x86 if, by that time, Quake had a fallback to do perspective correction without the FPU as in, for example, the game Descent. However, id Software chose not to include this. Quake also lacked the option to disable perspective correction, thus eliminating that potential speed boost for FPU-weak CPUs. This potential speed boost would have benefited not just Cyrix's users, but also users of AMD's K5 and especially of the 486. Quake's optimization for the Pentium went beyond FPU usage and catered to a number of other architectural quirks specific to the Pentium, further hindering performance of other CPUs even outside FPU operations. This bias in favor of the Pentium served to boost the popularity of Intel's Pentium CPUs amongst the computer game community.

=== Cyrix 6x86L and 6x86MX ===
The later 6x86L was a revised 6x86 that consumed less power, and the 6x86MX (M2) added MMX instructions and a larger L1 cache. The Cyrix MII, based on the 6x86MX design, was little more than a name change intended to help the chip compete better with the Pentium II.

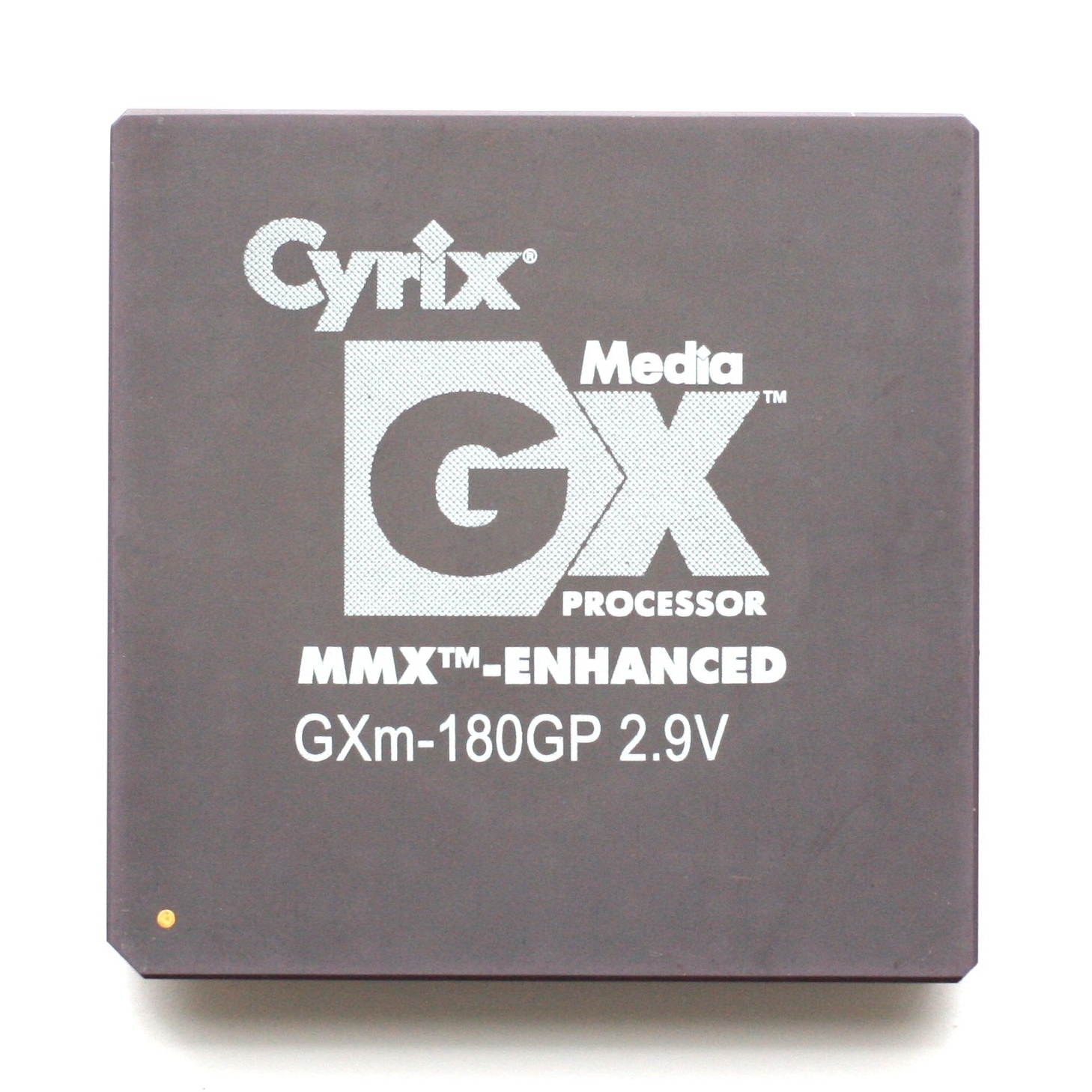
Cyrix MediaGX

=== Cyrix MediaGX ===
In 1996, Cyrix released the MediaGX CPU, which integrated all of the major discrete components of a PC, including sound and video, onto one chip. Initially based on the old 5x86 technology and running at 120 or 133 MHz, its performance was widely criticized but its low price made it successful. The MediaGX led to Cyrix's first big win, with Compaq using it in its lowest-priced Presario 2100 and 2200 computers. This led to further MediaGX sales to Packard Bell and also seemed to give Cyrix legitimacy, with 6x86 sales to both Packard Bell and eMachines following.

Later versions of the MediaGX ran at speeds of up to 333 MHz and added MMX support. A second chip was added to extend its video capabilities.

=== Cyrix Media GXi, Jedi, and Gobi Cayenne ===
Cyrix developed the Cayenne core as an evolution of the 6x86MX/MII processor, with dual issue FPU, support for 3DNow instructions and a 256 KB, 8-way associative, on-die L2 cache. This core was intended to be used in multiple products, including a successor to the MediaGX chip, a product codenamed Jedi which was to be a Socket 7 compatible processor which was later cancelled in favor of a Socket 370 compatible processor codenamed Gobi.

The Media GXi implementation was released in February 1997; intended for the mobile computing market, it had clock speeds of 120 Mhz to 180 Mhz, and had integrated graphics and audio controllers, making it useful for compact notebook computers. Later that year, Cyrix was acquired by National Semiconductor.

=== Cyrix M3 Jalapeno ===
This was a completely new core with a dual issue FPU, register renaming and out-of-order execution based on an 11-stage pipeline and 8-way associative, 8-way interleaved fully pipelined 256K L2 cache operating at core frequency.

Jalapeño's new floating point unit had dual independent FPU/MMX units and included both a fully pipelined, independent x87 adder and x87 multiplier. The Jalapeño design facilitated close integration between the core and the advanced 3D graphics engine, which was one of the first graphics subsystems to utilize a dual-issue FPU. The dual FPUs supported execution of both MMX and 3DNow instructions.

Jalapeno had an on-die memory controller based on RAMBUS technology capable of 3.2 GB/s to reduce memory latency and an integrated on-board 3D graphics which purportedly could process up to 3 million polygons per second and 266 million pixels per second based on a 233 Mhz clock. The on-die graphics had access to the L2 cache of the CPU to store textures. The design's initial clock speed target was 600-800 Mhz with headroom to scale to 1 Ghz and beyond. It was due to begin production in Q4 1999 and launch in the year 2000 on a 0.18 micron process with a die size of 110–120 mm^{2}.

It is unclear how advanced development on this core was when Cyrix was acquired from National Semiconductor by VIA Technologies and the project discontinued. VIA did, however, continue producing late-generation Cyrix chips under the name VIA Cyrix III (also known as Cyrix 3).

=== PR system ===
Because the 6x86 was more efficient on an instructions-per-cycle basis than Intel's Pentium, and because Cyrix sometimes used a faster bus speed than either Intel or AMD, Cyrix and competitor AMD co-developed the controversial Performance Rating (PR) system in an effort to compare their products more favorably with Intel's. Since a 6x86 running at 133 MHz generally benchmarked slightly faster than a Pentium running at 166 MHz, the 133 MHz 6x86 was marketed as the 6x86-P166+. Legal action from Intel, who objected to the use of the strings "P166" and "P200" in non-Pentium products, led to Cyrix adding the letter "R" to its names.

The PR nomenclature was controversial because while Cyrix's chips generally outperformed Intel's when running productivity applications, on a clock-for-clock basis its chips were slower for floating point operations, so the PR system performed more poorly when running the newest games. Additionally, since the 6x86's price encouraged its use in budget systems, performance could drop even further when compared with Pentium systems that were using faster hard drives, video cards, sound cards, and modems.

Although AMD also used the PR numbers for its early K5 chips, it soon abandoned that nomenclature with the introduction of the K6. However, it would use a similar concept in marketing its later CPUs, starting again with the Athlon XP.

== Manufacturing partners ==
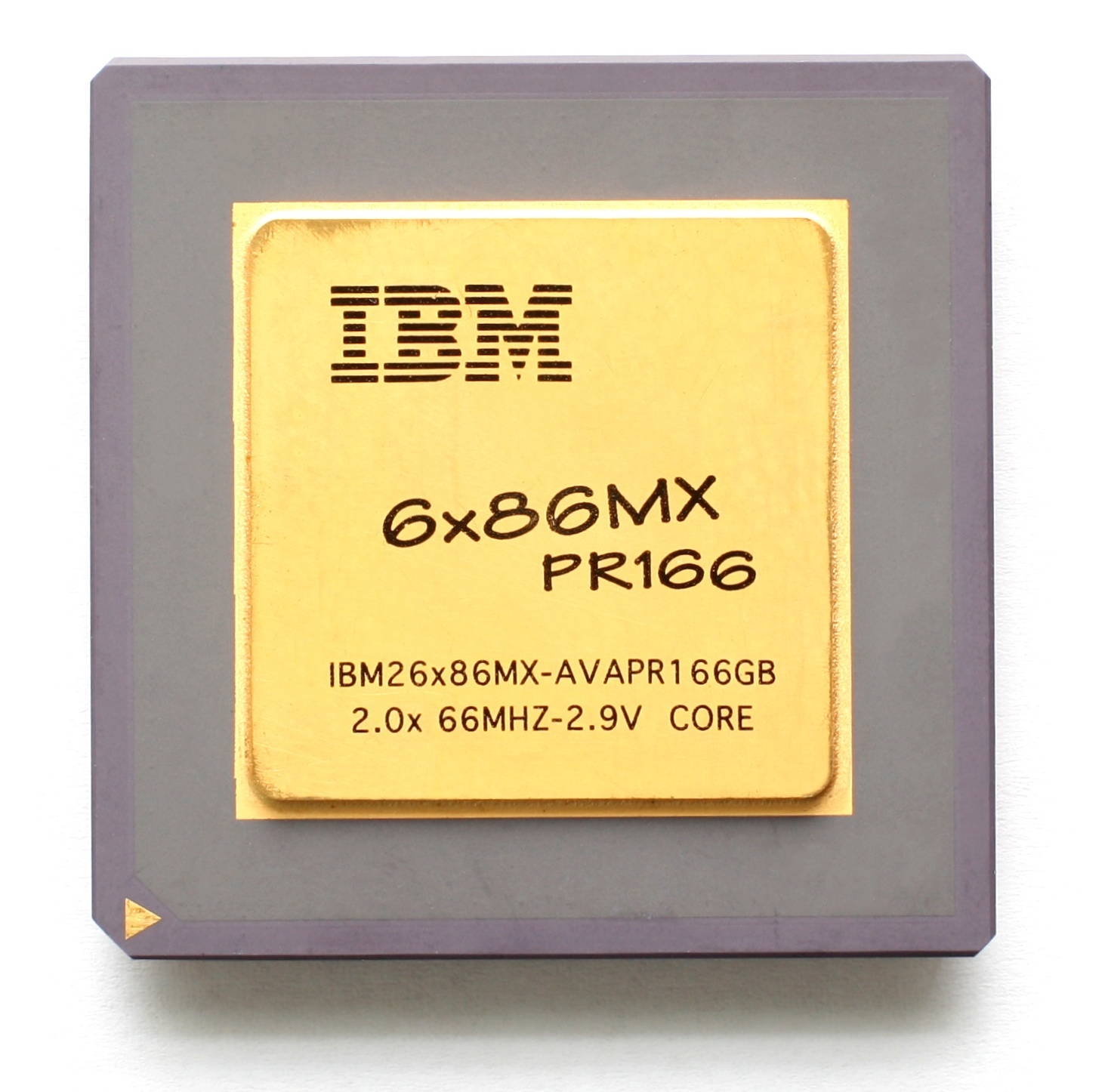
6x86MX under the IBM name

Cyrix had always been a fabless company: Cyrix designed and sold their own chips, but contracted the actual semiconductor manufacturing to an outside foundry. In the early days, Cyrix mostly used Texas Instruments production facilities and SGS Thomson (now STMicroelectronics). The Richardson, Texas office of VLSI Technology was also instrumental, as they provided workstations, EDA tools and ASIC design expertise to Cyrix engineers for their early design work. In 1994, following a series of disagreements with TI, and production difficulties at SGS Thomson, Cyrix turned to IBM Microelectronics, whose production technology rivaled that of Intel.

As part of the manufacturing agreement between the two companies, IBM received the right to build and sell Cyrix-designed CPUs under the IBM name. While some in the industry speculated this would lead to IBM using 6x86 CPUs extensively in its product line and improve Cyrix's reputation, IBM continued to mostly use Intel CPUs, and to a lesser extent, AMD CPUs, in the majority of its products and only used the Cyrix designs in a few budget models, mostly sold outside of the United States. IBM instead sold its 6x86 chips on the open market, competing directly against Cyrix and sometimes undercutting Cyrix's prices.

== Legal troubles ==
Unlike AMD, Cyrix had never manufactured or sold Intel designs under a negotiated license. Cyrix's designs were the result of meticulous in-house reverse engineering, and often made significant advances in the technology while still being socket compatible with Intel's products. In Cyrix's first product, the 8087 math co-processor, Cyrix used hardware math multipliers rather than the CORDIC algorithm, which allowed the chip to be faster and more accurate than Intel's co-processor. Thus, while AMD's 386s and even 486s had some Intel-written microcode software, Cyrix's designs were completely independent. Focused on removing potential competitors, Intel spent many years in legal battles with Cyrix, consuming Cyrix financial resources, claiming that the Cyrix 486 violated Intel's patents, when in reality the design was proven independent.

Intel lost the Cyrix case, which included multiple lawsuits in both federal and state courts in Texas. Some of the matters were settled out-of-court and some of the matters were settled by the court. In the end after all appeals, the courts ruled that Cyrix had the right to produce their own x86 designs in any foundry that held an Intel license. Cyrix was found to never have infringed any patent held by Intel. Intel feared having to face the antitrust claims made by Cyrix, so Intel paid Cyrix $12 million to settle the antitrust claims right before a federal jury in Sherman, Texas, was to hear and rule on the antitrust claims. As a part of the settlement of the antitrust claims against Intel, Cyrix also received a license to some of the patents that Intel had asserted that Cyrix infringed. Cyrix was free to have their products manufactured by any manufacturer that had a cross-license with Intel, which included SGS Thomson, IBM, and others. Intel had pursued IBM Microelectronics and SGS Thomson, both acting as foundries for Cyrix, with the rights of both IBM and SGS Thomson being upheld in separate legal judgements.

The follow-on 1997 Cyrix–Intel litigation was the reverse: instead of Intel claiming that Cyrix 486 chips violated their patents, now Cyrix claimed that Intel's Pentium Pro and Pentium II violated Cyrix patents – in particular, the power-management and register-renaming techniques. The case was expected to drag on for years but was settled quite promptly, by another mutual cross-license agreement. Intel and Cyrix now had full and free access to each others' patents. The settlement did not say whether the Pentium Pro violated Cyrix patents or not; it simply allowed Intel to carry on making products under a license from Cyrix.

== Merger with National Semiconductor ==
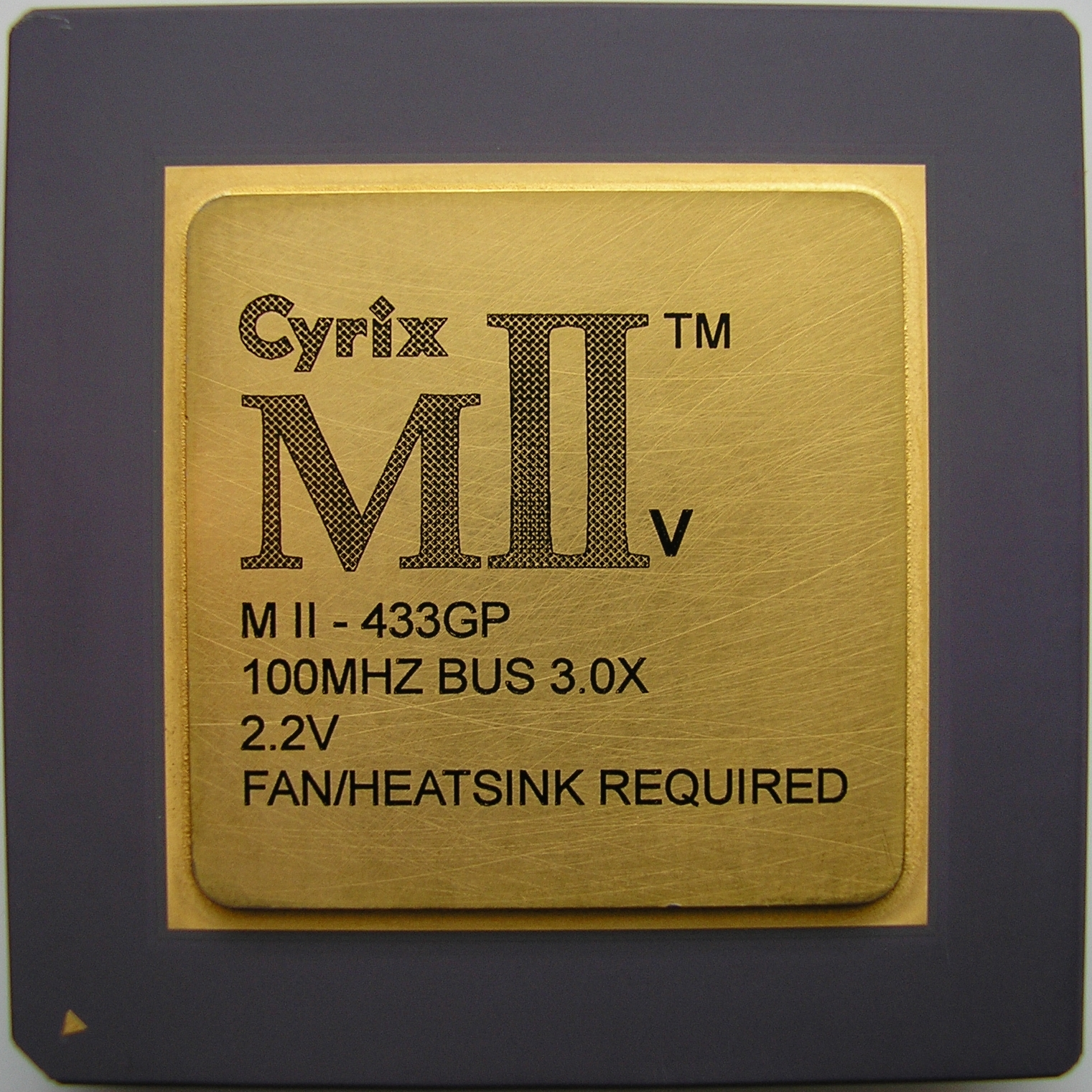
Cyrix MII 433GP front

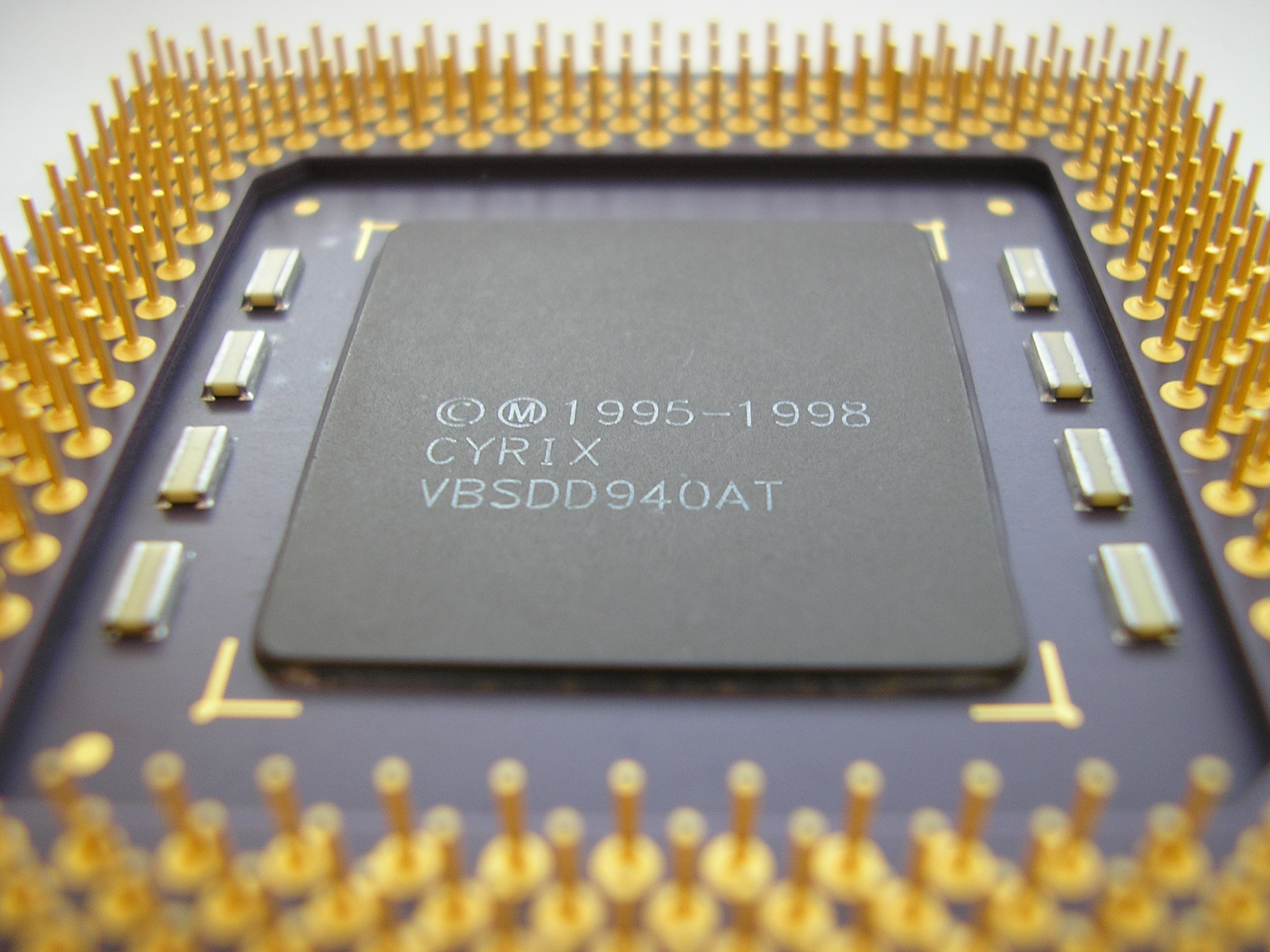
Cyrix MII 433GP back

In August 1997, while the litigation was still in progress, Cyrix merged with National Semiconductor (who also already held an Intel cross-license). This provided Cyrix with an extra marketing arm and access to National Semiconductor fabrication plants, which were originally constructed to produce RAM and high-speed telecommunications equipment. Since the manufacture of RAM and CPUs are similar, industry analysts at the time believed the marriage made sense. The IBM manufacturing agreement remained for a while longer, but Cyrix eventually switched all their production over to National's plant. The merger improved Cyrix's financial base and gave them much better access to development facilities.

The merger also resulted in a change of emphasis: National Semiconductor's priority was single-chip budget devices like the MediaGX, rather than higher-performance chips like the 6x86 and MII. Whether National Semiconductor doubted Cyrix's ability to produce high-performance chips or feared competing with Intel at the high end of the market is open to debate. The MediaGX, with no direct competition in the marketplace and with continual pressure on OEMs to release lower-cost PCs, looked like the safer bet.

National Semiconductor ran into financial trouble soon after the Cyrix merger, and these problems hurt Cyrix as well. By 1999, AMD and Intel were leapfrogging one another in clock speeds, reaching 450 MHz and beyond, while Cyrix took almost a year to push the MII from PR-300 to PR-333. Neither chip actually ran at 300+ MHz. A problem suffered by many of the MII models was that they used a non-standard 83 MHz bus. The vast majority of Socket 7 motherboards used a fixed 1/2 divider to clock the PCI bus, normally at 30 MHz or 33 MHz. With the MII's 83 MHz bus, this resulted in the PCI bus running alarmingly out-of-spec at 41.5 MHz. At this speed, many PCI devices could become unstable or fail to operate. Some motherboards supported a 1/3 divider, which resulted in the Cyrix PCI bus running at 27.7 MHz. This was more stable, but adversely affected system performance. The problem was only fixed in the final few models, which supported a 100 MHz bus. Almost all of the 6x86 line produced a large amount of heat, and required quite large (for the time) heatsink/fan combinations to run properly. There was also a problem which made the 6x86 incompatible with the then-popular Sound Blaster AWE64 sound card. Only 32 of its potential 64-voice polyphony could be utilized, as the WaveSynth/WG software synthesizer relied on a Pentium-specific instruction which the 6x86 lacked. Meanwhile, the MediaGX faced pressure from Intel's and AMD's budget chips, which also continued to get less expensive while offering greater performance. Cyrix, whose processors had been considered a performance product in 1996, had fallen to the mid-range, then to the entry level, and then to the fringe of the entry level, and was in danger of completely losing its market.

The last Cyrix-badged microprocessor was the Cyrix MII-433GP which ran at 300 MHz (100 × 3) and performed faster than an AMD K6/2-300 on FPU calculations (as benched with Dr. Hardware). However, this chip was regularly pitted against actual 433 MHz processors from other manufacturers. Arguably this made the comparison unfair, even though it was directly invited by Cyrix's own marketing.

National Semiconductor distanced itself from the CPU market, and without direction, the Cyrix engineers left one by one. By the time National Semiconductor sold Cyrix to VIA Technologies, the design team was no more and the market for the MII had disappeared. Via used the Cyrix name on a chip designed by Centaur Technology, since Via believed Cyrix had better name recognition than Centaur, or possibly even VIA.

Cyrix's failure is described by Glenn Henry, CEO of Centaur Technology, thus: "Cyrix had a good product, but they got bought by a 'big smokestack' company and they got bloated. When VIA bought Cyrix, they had 400, and we had 60, and we were turning out more product."

National Semiconductor retained the MediaGX design for a few more years, renaming it the Geode and hoping to sell it as an integrated processor. They sold the Geode to AMD in 2003.

In June 2006, AMD unveiled the world's lowest-power x86-compatible processor, which consumed only 0.9 W of power. This processor was based on the Geode core, demonstrating that Cyrix's architectural ingenuity still survived.

== Legacy ==
Although the company was short-lived and the brand name is no longer actively used by its current owner, Cyrix's competition with Intel created the market for budget CPUs, which cut the average selling price of PCs and ultimately forced Intel to release its Celeron line of budget processors and cut the prices of its faster processors more quickly in order to compete.

Additionally, the acquisition of Cyrix's intellectual property and agreements would be used by VIA Technologies to defend itself from its own legal troubles with Intel, even after VIA stopped using the Cyrix name.

== In popular media ==
The film Eraser featured a defense corporation known as "Cyrex". Cyrix became concerned about the potential name conflict, and contacted the film production company. The name was then retroactively digitally edited to become "Cyrez" to avoid any confusion.

In the machinima series Freeman's Mind, Ross Scott as Gordon Freeman (of the Half-Life video game franchise) curses Cyrix processors as a computer breaks in Episode 3.

In a feature article written by Something Awful, Cyrix is lampooned as a "an abandoned gas station with a tin 'Cyrix' sign bolted over the front entranceway" led by lead engineer, Dave Reynolds, who demanded to be referred to as "King Elsenor".
