= Linutop =

Environmentally friendly nettop computer

The Linutop is a small, light, environmentally friendly nettop computer containing a metal case and no moving parts, that runs the Linutop OS (a customized version of Linux based on the Xubuntu and Ubuntu/XFCE distribution). It is sold by Linutop SAS of Paris, France. Linutop Kiosk software and Linutop Tv server offer a full Digital signage solution. A variety of QT applications oriented towards secure web browsing and digital signage are available in the Operating system. Linutop is multimedia-capable and offers line-out/mic-in for sound. The device can be configured easily into a LTSP thin client. Linutop is suited for use in internet cafés, public libraries and schools.

== History ==
=== Linutop 1 ===
The first device was based on the ThinCan reference design from Estonian company Artec Group.

=== Linutop 2 ===
On February 20, 2008, the company unveiled the Linutop 2 based on the FIC ION A603 mini PC (like Works Everywhere Appliance). Linutop 2 had a stronger Geode processor and more memory, allowing it to run OpenOffice.org. It has 512 MB RAM and 1 GB flash memory storage.

== Hardware ==
=== Specifications ===
Model	Linutop 6	Linutop XS	Linutop 5	Linutop 4	Linutop 3	Linutop 2	Linutop 1
Launch Year	2017 ?	2016	2012	2011	2009	2008	2006
CPU	Intel Atom x5-Z8350	quad-core ARM	Intel Atom N270	Intel Atom N270	VIA C7 (x86) then Intel Atom N270	AMD Geode LX800	AMD Geode LX 700
ROM	16 GB Internal Memory	8 GB Internal Memory	4 GB Internal Memory	2 GB Internal Memory	2 GB Internal Memory	1 GB Internal Memory	1 GB Internal Memory
RAM	2 GB	1 GB	2 GB	1 GB ext. to 2 GB	1 GB ext. to 2 GB	512 MB	256 MB
USB ports	4	4	4	5	6	4	4
Ethernet	1000BASE-T	100BASE-T	1000BASE-T	1000BASE-T	1000BASE-T	100BASE-T	100BASE-T
video output	HDMI 1.4b output res. max 2560x1440	HDMI, res. max 1920x1440	VGA or DVI, res. max 1920x1440	VGA + DVI, res. max 1920x1440	VGA + DVI, res. max 1920x1440	VGA, res. max 1920x1440	VGA, res. max 1680x1050
Dimensions	95 cm × 91 cm × 36 cm (37 in × 36 in × 14 in)	9 cm × 6 cm × 2 cm (3.54 in × 2.36 in × 0.79 in)	152 cm × 11 cm × 35 cm (59.8 in × 4.3 in × 13.8 in)	182 cm × 201 cm × 36 cm (72 in × 79 in × 14 in)	235 cm × 236 cm × 55 cm (93 in × 93 in × 22 in)	14 cm × 14 cm × 35 cm (5.5 in × 5.5 in × 13.8 in)	15 cm × 93 cm × 27 cm (5.9 in × 36.6 in × 10.6 in)
Power	DC in 5 V, 4 A	DC in 5 V, 2,5 A	DC in 12 V, 3,3 A	DC in 12 V, 3,3 A	DC in 19 V	DC in 12 V-3,3 A	DC in 9 V-1,5 A
Consumption	<14 W	<3 W	<14 W	<14 W	<16 W	8 W	5 W
Weight	350 g (12 oz)	92 g (3.2 oz)	602 g (21.2 oz)	936 g (33.0 oz)	1.9 kg (67 oz)	580 g (20 oz)	280 g (9.9 oz)
Retail Prices	NC	189 € HT	No longer sold	No longer sold	No longer sold	No longer sold	No longer sold

=== Linutop XS ===
The Linutop XS is the smallest computer offered by Linutop. Due to its small size, and the absence of fan making it very silent, it is often hidden behind the dynamic display screens by professionals. The compact Linutop XS comes in a small aluminum case with dimensions 9 cm × 6 cm × 2 cm (3.5 in × 2.3 in × 0.8 in) for a weight of 92 grams (3 oz) and a power consumption of 3 watts. On board, there is a processor running at 900 MHz, a RAM of 1 GB and an 8 GB flash memory.

Connectors: HDMI, mini-jack audio, RJ-45 Ethernet, four USB 2.0, 5-volt micro USB power.

The Linutop XS is a professional packaging of the Raspberry Pi 2 and incorporates a 1080p HD video Hardware accelerator. With this compact configuration, designed for the fields of education, transport, trade and health for the dissemination of information.

=== Linutop 6 ===
Linutop 6 is the most powerful Linutop.

The Linutop 6 microcomputer is in the form of a small fanless metal case with dimensions 9.5 cm × 9.1 cm × 3.6 cm (3.7 in × 3.6 in × 1.4 in) for a weight of 350 grams (12 oz) and an energy consumption of 14 watts. On board, there is an Intel ATOM x5-Z8350 processor, a 2 GB RAM and a 16 GB flash memory.

Connectors: HDMI, RJ-45 Ethernet, four USB 2.0, 5-volt power supply.

With this configuration, the Linutop 6 computer targets a varied use where compactness and power are required.

== Linutop OS ==
=== Linutop Kiosk ===
Linutop Kiosk is a software in Linutop OS that allows you to easily configure:

- A secure Internet access point.
- A dynamic display, multi-format (photos, HD videos, MP3, web pages, music, PDF ...)

=== Linutop OS 14.04 for PC ===
Linutop OS 14.04 is based on Xubuntu / XFCE It contains features designed for business use cases:

- Firefox 44, Libre Office 4, et VLC 2, Terminal server client, pdf viewer, GNU Paint, Mirage, Archive Manager, VNC, Gedit, Samba
- Internet kiosk : Full screen, toolbar management, white/blacklist management.
- Display kiosk : user can define a playlist loop of URLs, photos, video and PDF
- Configuration panel allows the user to "lock" the configuration, to backup or restore on bootable USB Key.
- size 850 MB for USB key, hard drive or flash memory
- minimum PC requirements : PIII 800 MHz, 512 MB RAM

=== Linutop OS XS for Raspberry Pi ===
Linutop OS XS is based on Raspbian / XFCE It contains features designed for business use cases:

- Epiphany web browser, Libre Office 3, et VLC 2 (with hardware acceleration), Terminal server client, pdf viewer, GNU Paint, Mirage, Archive Manager, VNC, Gedit, Samba
- Internet kiosk : Full screen, toolbar management, white/blacklist management.
- Display kiosk : user can define a playlist loop of URLs, photos, video and PDF
- Configuration panel allows the user to "lock" the configuration, to configure the graphics.
- size 2900 MB for microSD flash memory
- Raspberry Pi compatibility : Zero, Zero W, A, A+, B, B+, 2, 3

a demo version of Linutop OS is available for free Also available in NOOBS format.

== Linutop TV ==
Linutop tv has been designed to manage a network of connected digital signage screens and allows centralized management via an HTTP interface. Each screens needs a player (PC, Raspberry Pi, or Linutop Mini PC), running Linutop Kiosk software, connected to the server in order to update display content automatically.

Linutop tv is a server solution available in two versions:

- SaaS (or "cloud") server: accessible via Internet.
- Private (local) server: works on the local network. This solution is often used in corporations intranet. It offers maximum security.

== Sources ==
- Official website
- Linutop Blog

== See also ==
- fit-PC
- EeePC
- Zonbu
- Koolu
- Raspberry Pi
- Ubuntu (operating system)
- Digital Signage
- Interactive kiosk
