= ThinCan =

Thin client manufactured in Estonia

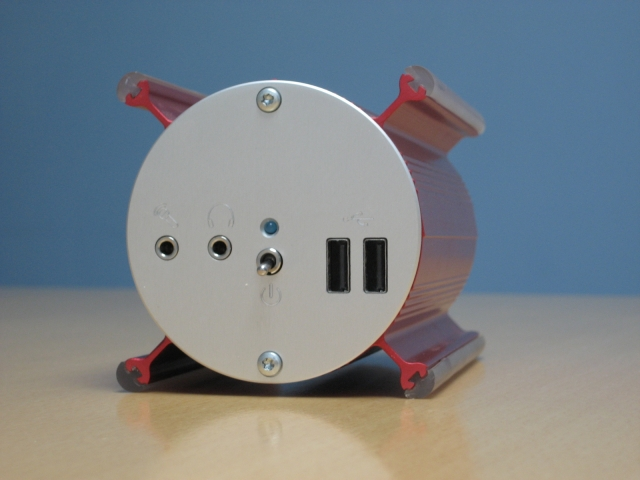
- A first-generation ThinCan, based on the Geode SC2200
- Manufacturer: Artec Group
- Type: Thin client
- Media: 32 to 512 MB of flash
- Operating system: LinuxBIOS
- CPU: Geode
- Memory: 64 to 256 MB of DRAM
- Connectivity: Ethernet; USB ports

ThinCan is a thin client manufactured by Estonian electronic design start-up Artec Group. The ThinCan remained relatively unknown outside Estonia until 2006, when a recent ThinCan iteration was selected as the hardware base for the Linutop, a network appliance that greatly stimulated the market for lightweight computing platforms. The ThinCan was also commercialized by SmartLink under the Revnetek brand name.

== Hardware ==
Functionally, all ThinCan production models offer similar features:

- Front panel: 1/8" stereo audio, USB ports.
- Back panel: Ethernet port, VGA output, PSU connector.

Aesthetically, the original ThinCan was an exercise in futuristic looks, with brushed aluminum end caps and a tubular aluminum shape that featured alternating patterns of decorative serrations along the surface of the tube. The tube came painted in one's choice of several transparent colors (black, dark blue, light blue, purple, red) for an authentic "Jetsons" feel.

After an early prototype based on a custom x86 core, supporting PS/2 keyboard and mouse, the platform was redesigned around an NSC Geode SC2200 supporting only USB peripherals. An optional on-board SmartCard reader attached to an internally mounted USB port made the original ThinCan an instant hit on the local market, due to an Estonian legislation dating from 2001 that mandated the issuance of a national Electronic ID card to all citizens and their use to access many public services.

Still, while the futuristic design received some attention in the IT press, the prohibitive cost of machining an extruded aluminum tube with intricate decorative serrations prevented the manufacturer from achieving commercial success with this early model.

In 2003, the company revised the design towards a simpler cost-effective flat boxy shape for their DBE60 model (initially commercialized as the ThinCan SE). Aside from the addition of a parallel printer port, the DBE60 is functionally identical to the original ThinCan and built around the same NSC Geode SC2200.

In 2005, this design was updated for the AMD Geode LX700-based DBE61 model, with USB 2.0 provided by a CS5536 companion chip. The parallel printer port was then removed, returning the design to an all-USB configuration. Linutop SARL retained this model as a starting point for their Linutop-1 product.

In 2007, the DBE61 design was upgraded with Gigabit Ethernet support. The manufacturer calls this the DBE62.

In 2009, the DBE62 design was reconfigured to use SO DIMM memory and IDE Compact Flash media. The manufacturer calls this the DBE63.

== Software ==
=== Firmware ===
SC2200-based models boot using a proprietary loader called Clara that was developed by Artec.

All LX700-based models can natively boot using Coreboot. This started as a Geode GX port developed by AMD for the OLPC prototype, to which Artec added Geode LX support. That code was later adopted and further polished by AMD, after the OLPC switched to the LX700 for its production models. This Coreboot port was used on the SmartLink model and on several custom Artec models configured as network appliances.

Meanwhile, both Artec's PXE-boot and Linutop's USB-boot DBE61 models, plus all DBE62 and DBE63 models, use a General Software BIOS.

=== Operating system ===
The original ThinCan ran on Windows CE and launched into an RDP client for Windows Terminal Services.

DBE60 models come with either the same RDP client as the original ThinCan or with Etherboot support for UNIX terminal services.

DBE61 models come with either a BIOS with PXE support optimized for LTSP or with a BIOS for USB booting Linutop's own Linux distribution. Meanwhile, SmartLink preloads their DBE61 models with their own versatile firmware called R-BOX that can be user-configured to launch into either an RDP client or into a Web kiosk – both of which are implemented using Free Software components – and which makes use of the Coreboot port.

DBE62 models have a BIOS that first attempts booting from USB and, if no bootable USB media is found, then attempts PXE booting – essentially combining the boot options of Artec's and Linutop's models into a single configuration.

DBE63 models run on Embedded Windows XP and launch into a Web kiosk.

== Timeline ==
- 1999 – prototype based on a custom x86 core.
- 2001 – round model with NSC Geode SC2200.
- 2003 – DBE60 model with NSC Geode SC2200.
- 2005 – DBE61 model with AMD Geode LX700 and CS5536.
- 2007 – DBE62 model with AMD Geode LX700 and CS5536, plus Gigabit Ethernet.
- 2009 – DBE63 model with AMD Geode LX700 and CS5536, plus Gigabit Ethernet.

== See also ==
- Geode is the chipset used in the ThinCan
- Coreboot is used to bootstrap recent ThinCan models
- OLPC is another lightweight computer based on the Geode LX
- Thin Client is the design principle behind the ThinCan
