= MediaGX =

Series of x86-compatible processor

Cyrix MediaGX
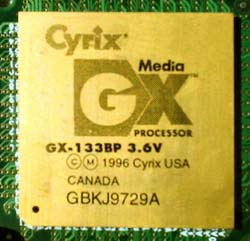
- Cyrix MediaGX, BGA

General information
- Launched: February 20, 1997
- Common manufacturer: National Semiconductor
- CPUID code: 440h (GX/GXi), 540h (GXm)

Performance
- Max. CPU clock rate: 120 MHz to 300 MHz
- FSB speeds: 30 MHz to 33 MHz

Physical specifications
- Cores: 1

Cache
- L1 cache: 16 KiB unified

Architecture and classification
- Technology node: 0.35 μm to 0.4 μm
- Microarchitecture: 5x86
- Instruction set: x86-16, IA-32
- Extensions: MMX (GXm)

History
- Predecessor: Cyrix 5x86
- Successor: Geode

The MediaGX CPU is an x86-compatible processor that was designed by Cyrix and manufactured by National Semiconductor following the two companies' merger. It was introduced in 1997. The core is based on the integration of the Cyrix Cx5x86 CPU core with hardware to process video and audio output (XpressRAM, XpressGRAPHICS, XpressAUDIO). Following the buyout of Cyrix by National Semiconductor and the sale of the Cyrix name and trademarks to VIA Technologies, the core was developed by National Semiconductor into the Geode line of processors, which was subsequently sold to Advanced Micro Devices.

Whether this processor belongs in the fourth or fifth generation of x86 processors can be considered a matter of debate as the processor was based on the 5x86 (a scaled down version of the Cyrix 6x86). While the 5x86 was intended to compete with the Intel Pentium line, the 5th generation x86, it was designed to interface with a 4th generation (80486) motherboard and had only the 486's instruction set, lacking the ability to run software requiring the Pentium's new instructions.

The MediaGX CPU was mostly used for subcompact laptops. It was also used in the CTX EzBook V92C266, Compaq Presario 1220 and 1230 laptops, Compaq Presario 2100 and 2200 desktops, Casio Cassiopeia Fiva MPC-100 series subnotebook and MPC-501 tablet PCs, and many others, as well as in high-performance embedded applications such as the Pinball 2000 arcade pinball system and Atari Games arcade platforms. Sun Microsystems used MediaGXm in the Dover JavaStation.

== History ==
The MediaGX was launched on February 20, 1997. Compaq would be using the chip in some of their computers such as the Presario 2000, which went on sale for $999. This was due to a partnership between Cyrix and Compaq. The MediaGX was first available in speeds of 120 and 133 MHz with pricing of $79 and $99.

The 150 MHz version of the MedixGX was available by June of 1997. This version of the chip would be used in the Presario 2120. The 150 MHz chip would cost $99 each in bulk quantities with the 133 and 120 MHz costing $88 and $60.

== Specifications ==
=== Virtual Subsystem Architecture ===
Virtual Subsystem Architecture (VSA) emulates a presence of the real hardware VGA (XpressGRAPHICS) and Sound Blaster (XpressAUDIO). The access to the hardware resources traps via BIOS and emulates in the System Management Mode (SMM), enabling it to execute transparently to the operating system, drivers and applications.

=== Media GX ===
- Manufacturing process: 0.4 μm
- Cache: L1 16 KB unified
- Core speed: 120, 133, 150 MHz
- Bus speed: 33 MHz

=== Media GXi ===
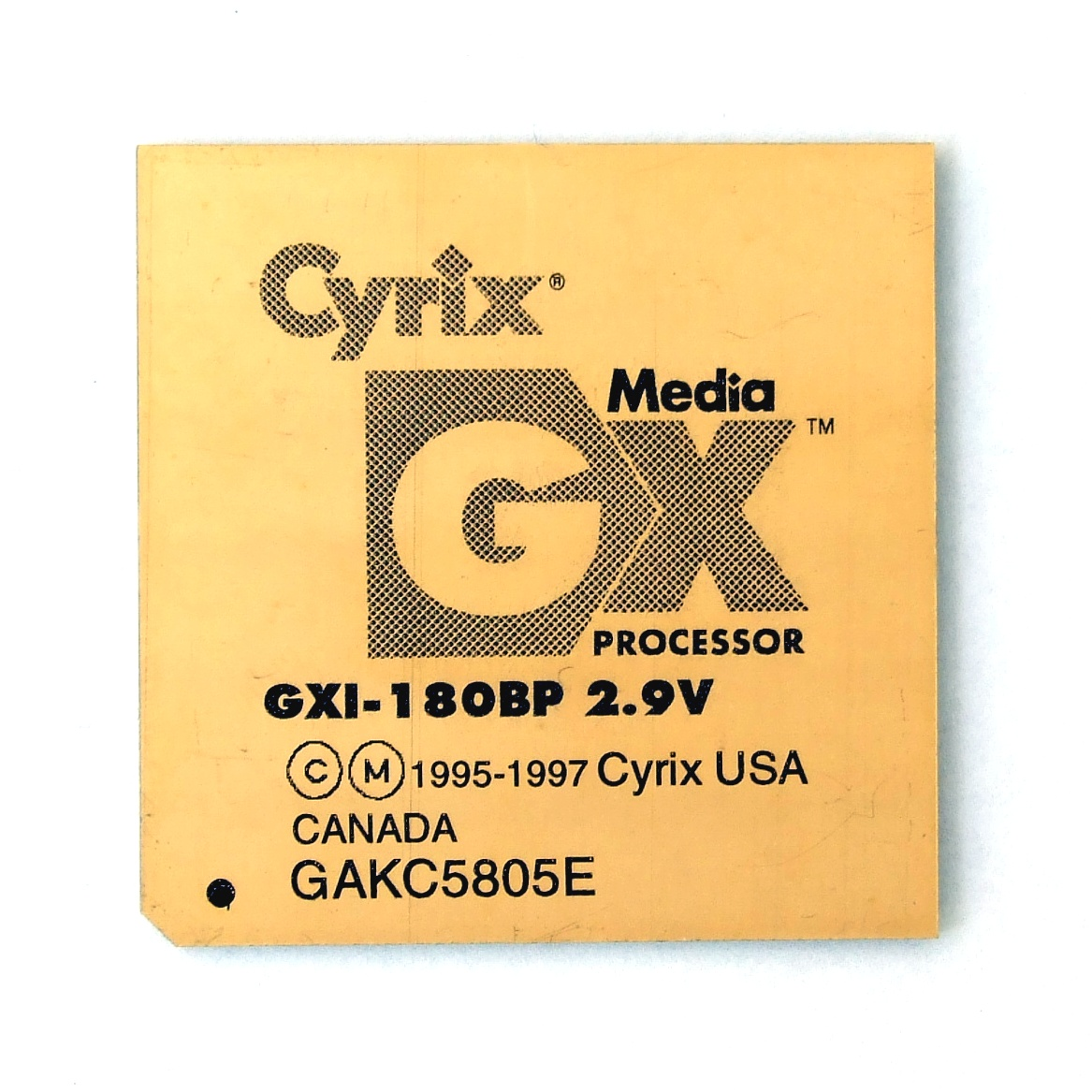
Cyrix MediaGXi, 180 MHz, BGA.

Cyrix MediaGXi is an improved version of the MediaGX.

- Manufacturing process: 0.35 μm
- Cache: L1 16 KB unified
- Core speed: 120, 133, 150, 166, 180 MHz

=== MediaGXm ===
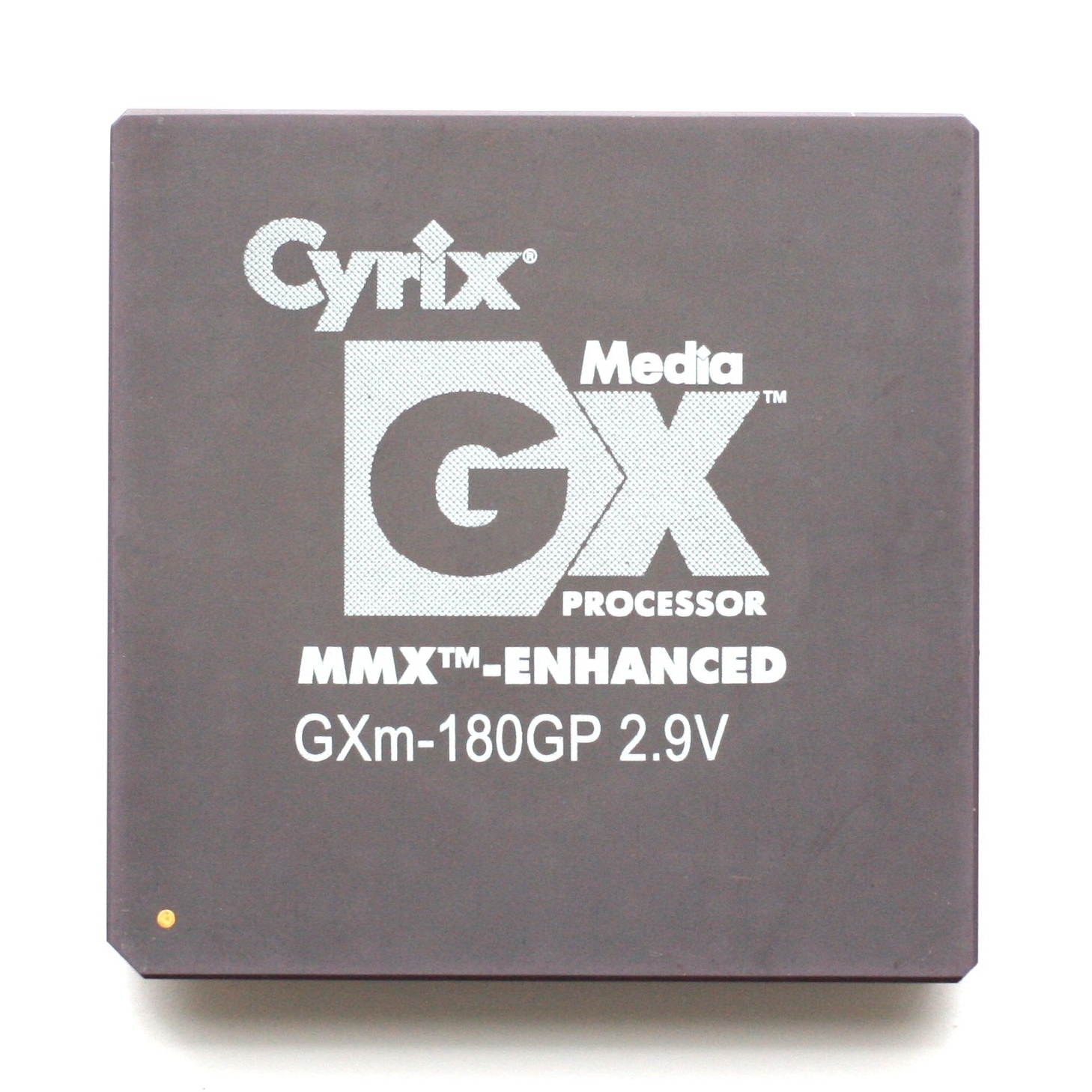
Cyrix MediaGXm

The MediaGXm is an improved MediaGX with an implementation of the MMX enhanced instruction set.

- Manufacturing process: 0.35 μm 4-layer metal CMOS process
- Core speed: 180–266 MHz
- Bus speed: 33 MHz
- Cache:
  - L1 cache size 16 KB write-back 4-way set associative unified I/D cache.
  - Or 12-Kbyte unified L1 Cache and 4K scratchpad for SMM & Graphics.
- Integrated peripherals:
  - PCI controller
  - Display controller and 2D graphics accelerator
  - Hardware MPEG-1 supports full-screen video playback
  - 16-bit audio subsystem Sound Blaster 16/Pro compatible
  - 64-bit SDRAM controller
- V core: 2.9 V
- V I/O: 3.3 V
- Package: 320-pin Ceramic PGA; 352-ball BGA
- System chipset: Cx5520 352-pin BGA

National Semiconductor offered this processor under the name Geode GXM.

=== Comparison to other contemporary processors ===
The MediaGX platform does not provide support for external Level-2 cache memory, typical for motherboard designs of the period. All of the cache must be on the processor die.

MediaGX processors can only run on motherboards specifically designed for the same model of the processor due to tight integration between the processor and its companion chipset.

The graphics, sound, and PCI bus ran at the same speed as the processor clock also due to tight integration. This made the processor appear much slower than its actual rated speed. However, the graphics system is able to use the main system memory providing for significant cost savings on the basic systems and embedded controllers in the market for this platform.

== See also ==
- Cyrix
- Cyrix Cx5x86
- National Semiconductor
- Geode (processor)
- AMD
