= Wireless Router Application Platform =

Single board computer format

The Wireless Router Application Platform (WRAP) is a format of single board computer defined by Swiss company PC Engines. This is specially designed for wireless router, firewall, load balancer, VPN or other network appliances.

== Basic specs ==
- 32-bit x86 compatible CPU, low energy consumption (AMD Geode SC1100 at 266 MHz)
- supports MMX instructions
- 64-bit SDRAM memory controller (max: 89 MHz)
- PCI bus controller
- IDE interfaces
- ACPI 1.0-compatible power management
- tinyBIOS : Made specially by PC Engines
- 64 or 128MB SDRAM
- Compact flash memory (includes boot OS)
- Monitoring: watchdog timer, LM77 thermal monitor
- Power supply: 7V ~ 18V external DC power or Power over Ethernet
- LAN: National semiconductor DP83816
- I/O: MiniPCI slots, console serial port

== Different boards ==
There are three different models of the WRAP:

- The WRAP 1-1 has two Ethernet ports, and two mini-PCI slots, on a 16x16cm board.
- The WRAP 1-2 has three Ethernet ports and one mini-PCI slot, on a 16x16cm board.
- The WRAP 2 has one Ethernet port, and two mini-PCI slots, on a 10x16cm board.

== Operating System ==
The WRAP is capable of running many different operating systems, including various Linux distributions, FreeBSD, NetBSD, OpenBSD, as well as proprietary OSes. The WRAP lacks a keyboard controller (for obvious reasons), so some OSes that rely on one for the boot process may have to be modified.

== End Of Life (EOL) ==
PC Engines announced the end of life for the WRAP platform in 2007. The board was replaced by the ALIX.
