= Koolu =

Koolu was a Canadian company started by Andrew Greig and Jon "maddog" Hall, which aim is to provide low-power computer appliances powered by free- and open-source software. It is now defunct.

Their main product was the "Works Everywhere Appliance" a Linux-powered device with which the company launched. It was offered as a Google Apps client device.
