= List of discontinued x86 instructions =

Instructions that have at some point been present as documented instructions in one or more x86 processors, but where the processor series containing the instructions are discontinued or superseded, with no known plans to reintroduce the instructions.

== Intel instructions ==
=== i386 instructions ===
The following instructions were introduced in the Intel 80386, but later discontinued:

Instruction	Opcode	Description	Eventual fate
XBTS r, r/m	0F A6 /r	Extract Bit String	Discontinued from revision B1 of the 80386 onwards. Opcodes briefly reused for CMPXCHG in Intel 486 stepping A only − CMPXCHG was moved to different opcode from 486 stepping B onwards. Opcodes later reused for VIA PadLock.
IBTS r/m, r	0F A7 /r	Insert Bit String	Discontinued from revision B1 of the 80386 onwards. Opcodes briefly reused for CMPXCHG in Intel 486 stepping A only − CMPXCHG was moved to different opcode from 486 stepping B onwards. Opcodes later reused for VIA PadLock.
MOV r32,TRx	0F 24 /r	Move from test register	Present in Intel 386 and 486 − not present in Intel Pentium or any later Intel CPUs (except they're present in the i486-derived Quark X1000). Present in all Cyrix CPUs.
MOV TRx,r32	0F 26 /r	Move to test register	Present in Intel 386 and 486 − not present in Intel Pentium or any later Intel CPUs (except they're present in the i486-derived Quark X1000). Present in all Cyrix CPUs.

=== Itanium instructions ===
These instructions are only present in the x86 operation mode of early Intel Itanium processors with hardware support for x86. This support was added in "Merced" and removed in "Montecito", replaced with software emulation.

Instruction	Opcode	Description
JMPE r/m16 JMPE r/m32	NFx 0F 00 /6	Jump To Intel Itanium Instruction Set.
JMPE disp16/32	NFx 0F B8 rel16/32	Jump To Intel Itanium Instruction Set.

=== MPX instructions ===
These instructions were introduced in 6th generation Intel Core "Skylake" CPUs. The last CPU generation to support them was the 9th generation Core "Coffee Lake" CPUs.

Intel MPX adds 4 new registers, BND0 to BND3, that each contains a pair of addresses. MPX also defines a bounds-table as a 2-level directory/table data structure in memory that contains sets of upper/lower bounds.

Instruction	Opcode (Note: For all of the MPX instructions, 16-bit addressing is disallowed − this effectively makes the address-size override prefix 67h mandatory in 16-bit mode and prohibited in 32-bit mode. In 64-bit mode, the 67h prefix is ignored for the MPX instructions − address size is always 64-bit. These behaviors are unique to the MPX instructions.)	Description
BNDMK b, m	F3 0F 1B /r (Note: For BNDMK in 64-bit mode, RIP-relative addressing is not permitted and will cause #UD.)	Make lower and upper bound from memory address expression. The lower bound is given by base component of address, the upper bound by 1's-complement of the address as a whole.
BNDCL b, r/m	F3 0F 1A /r	Check address against lower bound. BNDCL, BNDCU and BNDCL all produce a #BR exception if the bounds check fails.
BNDCU b, r/m	F2 0F 1A /r	Check address against upper bound in 1's-complement form
BNDCN b, r/m	F2 0F 1B /r	Check address against upper bound.
BMDMOV b, b/m	66 0F 1A /r	Move a pair of memory bounds to/from memory or between bounds-registers.
BNDMOV b/m, b	66 0F 1B /r	Move a pair of memory bounds to/from memory or between bounds-registers.
BNDLDX b,mib	NP 0F 1A /r (Note: The BNDLDX and BNDSTX instructions requires memory addressing modes that use the SIB byte − non-SIB addressing modes cause #UD.)	Load bounds from the bounds-table, using address translation using an sib-addressing expression mib. (Note: The BNDLDX and BNDSTX instructions produce a #BR exception if bounds directory entry is not valid (which prevents address translation).)
BNDSTX mib,b	NP 0F 1B /r	Store bounds into the bounds-table, using address translation using an sib-addressing expression mib.
BND	F2	Instruction prefix used with certain branch instructions (Note: The branch instructions that can accept a BND prefix are the near forms of JMP (opcodes E9 and FF /4), CALL (opcodes E8 and FF /2), RET (opcodes C2 and C3), and the short/near forms of the Jcc instructions (opcodes 70..7F and 0F 80..8F). If the BNDPRESERVE config bit is not set, then executing any of these branch instructions without the BND prefix will clear all four bounds registers. (Other branch instructions − such as e.g. far jumps, short jumps (EB), LOOP, IRET etc − do not clear the bounds registers regardless of whether an F2h prefix is present or not.)) to indicate that they should not clear the bounds registers.

The XSAVE area that was used to save MPX registers on context switches has been repurposed for APX.

=== Hardware Lock Elision ===
The Hardware Lock Elision feature of Intel TSX is marked in the Intel SDM as removed from 2019 onwards. This feature took the form of two instruction prefixes, XACQUIRE and XRELEASE, that could be attached to memory atomics/stores to elide the memory locking that they represent.

Instruction prefix	Opcode	Description
XACQUIRE	F2	Instruction prefix to indicate start of hardware lock elision, used with memory atomic instructions only (for other instructions, the F2 prefix may have other meanings). When used with such instructions, may start a transaction instead of performing the memory atomic operation.
XRELEASE	F3	Instruction prefix to indicate end of hardware lock elision, used with memory atomic/store instructions only (for other instructions, the F3 prefix may have other meanings). When used with such instructions during hardware lock elision, will end the associated transaction instead of performing the store/atomic.

The XACQUIRE and XRELEASE prefixes can be used with the following instructions:

- LOCK-prefixed memory read–modify–write forms of the instructions XCHG,ADD,ADC,SUB,SBB,AND,OR,XOR,INC,DEC,NEG,NOT,BTC,BTR,BTS,XADD,CMPXCHG and CMPXCHG8B.
- The memory read–modify–write form of the XCHG instruction, regardless of LOCK prefix.
- XRELEASE can also be used with some store instructions without LOCK prefix: MOV mem,reg (opcodes 88h/89h) and MOV mem,imm (opcodes C6h/C7h)

These prefixes cannot be used with the CMPXCHG16B instruction, nor with the direct-offset store opcodes (opcodes A2h/A3h).

=== VP2INTERSECT instructions ===
The VP2INTERSECT instructions (an AVX-512 subset) were introduced in Tiger Lake (11th generation mobile Core processors), but were never officially supported on any other Intel processors – they are now considered deprecated and are listed in the Intel SDM as removed from 2023 onwards.

As of July 2024, the VP2INTERSECT instructions have been re-introduced on AMD Zen 5 processors.

Instruction	Opcode	Description
VP2INTERSECTD k1+1, xmm2, xmm3/m128/m32bcst VP2INTERSECTD k1+1, ymm2, ymm3/m256/m32bcst VP2INTERSECTD k1+1, zmm2, zmm3/m512/m32bcst	EVEX.NDS.F2.0F38.W0 68 /r	Store, in an even/odd pair of mask registers, the indicators of the locations of value matches between 32-bit lanes in the two vector source arguments.
VP2INTERSECTQ k1+1, xmm2, xmm3/m128/m64bcst VP2INTERSECTQ k1+1, ymm2, ymm3/m256/m64bcst VP2INTERSECTQ k1+1, zmm2, zmm3/m512/m64bcst	EVEX.NDS.F2.0F38.W1 68 /r	Store, in an even/odd pair of mask registers, the indicators of the locations of value matches between 64-bit lanes in the two vector source arguments.

=== Instructions specific to Xeon Phi processors ===
==== "Knights Corner" instructions ====
The first generation Xeon Phi processors, codenamed "Knights Corner" (KNC), supported a large number of instructions that are not seen in any later x86 processor. An instruction reference is available − the instructions/opcodes unique to KNC are the ones with VEX and MVEX prefixes (except for the KMOV, KNOT and KORTEST instructions − these are kept with the same opcodes and function in AVX-512, but with an added "W" appended to their instruction names).

Most of these KNC-unique instructions are similar but not identical to instructions in AVX-512 − later Xeon Phi processors replaced these instructions with AVX-512.

Early versions of AVX-512 avoided the instruction encodings used by KNC's MVEX prefix, however with the introduction of Intel APX (Advanced Performance Extensions) in 2023, some of the old KNC MVEX instruction encodings have been reused for new APX encodings. For example, both KNC and APX accept the instruction encoding 62 F1 79 48 6F 04 C1 as valid, but assign different meanings to it:

- KNC: VMOVDQA32 zmm0, k0, xmmword ptr [rcx+rax*8]{uint8} – vector load with data conversion
- APX: VMOVDQA32 zmm0, [rcx+r16*8] – vector load with one of the new APX extended-GPRs used as scaled index

==== "Knights Landing" and "Knights Mill" instructions ====
Some of the AVX-512 instructions in the Xeon Phi "Knights Landing" and later models belong to the AVX-512 subsets "AVX512ER", "AVX512_4FMAPS", "AVX512PF" and "AVX512_4VNNIW", all of which are unique to the Xeon Phi series of processors. The ER and PF subsets were introduced in "Knights Landing" − the 4FMAPS and 4VNNIW instructions were later added in "Knights Mill".

The ER and 4FMAPS instructions are floating-point arithmetic instructions that all follow a given pattern where:

- EVEX.W is used to specify floating-point format (0=FP32, 1=FP64)
- The bottom opcode bit is used to select between packed and scalar operation (0: packed, 1:scalar)
- For a given operation, all the scalar/packed variants belong to the same AVX-512 subset.
- The instructions all support result masking by opmask registers. The AVX512ER instructions also all support broadcast of memory operands.
- The only supported vector width is 512 bits.

Operation	AVX-512 subset	Basic opcode	FP32 instructions (W=0)		FP64 instructions (W=1)		RC/SAE
Operation	AVX-512 subset	Basic opcode	Packed	Scalar	Packed	Scalar	RC/SAE
Xeon Phi specific instructions (ER, 4FMAPS)							
Reciprocal approximation with an accuracy of $2^{-28}$ (Note: For the AVX512ER instructions, a numerically exact reference is available as C code.)	ER	EVEX.66.0F38 (CA/CB) /r	VRCP28PS z,z,z/m512	VRCP28SS x,x,x/m32	VRCP28PD z,z,z/m512	VRCP28SD x,x,x/m64	SAE
Reciprocal square root approximation with an accuracy of $2^{-28}$	ER	EVEX.66.0F38 (CC/CD) /r	VRSQRT28PS z,z,z/m512	VRSQRT28SS x,x,x/m32	VRSQRT28PD z,z,z/m512	VRSQRT28SD x,x,x/m64	SAE
Exponential $2^{x}$ approximation with $2^{-23}$ relative error	ER	EVEX.66.0F38 C8 /r	VEXP2PS z,z/m512	No	VEXP2PD z,z/m512	No	SAE
Fused-multiply-add, 4 iterations	4FMAPS	EVEX.F2.0F38 (9A/9B) /r	V4FMADDPS z,z+3,m128	V4FMADDSS x,x+3,m128	No	No	
Fused negate-multiply-add, 4 iterations	4FMAPS	EVEX.F2.0F38 (AA/AB) /r	V4FNMADDPS z,z+3,m128	V4FNMADDSS x,x+3,m128	No	No	

The AVX512PF instructions are a set of 16 prefetch instructions. These instructions all use VSIB encoding, where a memory addressing mode using the SIB byte is required, and where the index part of the SIB byte is taken to index into the AVX512 vector register file rather than the GPR register file. The selected AVX512 vector register is then interpreted as a vector of indexes, causing the standard x86 base+index+displacement address calculation to be performed for each vector lane, causing one associated memory operation (prefetches in case of the AVX512PF instructions) to be performed for each active lane. The instruction encodings all follow a pattern where:

- EVEX.W is used to specify format of the prefetchable data (0:FP32, 1:FP64)
- The bottom bit of the opcode is used to indicate whether the AVX512 index register is considered a vector of sixteen signed 32-bit indexes (bit 0 not set) or eight signed 64-bit indexes (bit 0 set)
- The instructions all support operation masking by opmask registers.
- The only supported vector width is 512 bits.

Operation	Basic opcode	32-bit indexes (opcode C6)		64-bit indexes (opcode C7)	
Operation	Basic opcode	FP32 prefetch (W=0)	FP64 prefetch (W=1)	FP32 prefetch (W=0)	FP64 prefetch (W=1)
Prefetch into L1 cache (T0 hint)	EVEX.66.0F38 (C6/C7) /1 /vsib	VGATHERPF0DPS vm32z {k1}	VGATHERPF0DPD vm32y {k1}	VGATHERPF0QPS vm64z {k1}	VGATHERPF0QPD vm64y {k1}
Prefetch into L2 cache (T1 hint)	EVEX.66.0F38 (C6/C7) /2 /vsib	VGATHERPF1DPS vm32z {k1}	VGATHERPF1DPD vm32y {k1}	VGATHERPF1QPS vm64z {k1}	VGATHERPF1QPD vm64y {k1}
Prefetch into L1 cache (T0 hint) with intent to write	EVEX.66.0F38 (C6/C7) /5 /vsib	VSCATTERPF0DPS vm32z {k1}	VSCATTERPF0DPD vm32y {k1}	VSCATTERPF0QPS vm64z {k1}	VSCATTERPF0QPD vm64y {k1}
Prefetch into L2 cache (T1 hint) with intent to write	EVEX.66.0F38 (C6/C7) /6 /vsib	VSCATTERPF1DPS vm32z {k1}	VSCATTERPF1DPD vm32y {k1}	VSCATTERPF1QPS vm64z {k1}	VSCATTERPF1QPD vm64y {k1}

The AVX512_4VNNIW instructions read a 128-bit data item from memory, containing 4 two-component vectors (each component being signed 16-bit). Then, for each of 4 consecutive AVX-512 registers, they will, for each 32-bit lane, interpret the lane as a two-component vector (signed 16-bit) and perform a dot-product with the corresponding two-component vector that was read from memory (the first two-component vector from memory is used for the first AVX-512 source register, and so on). These results are then accumulated into a destination vector register.

Instruction	Opcode	Description
VP4DPWSSD zmm1{k1}{z}, zmm2+3, m128	EVEX.512.F2.0F38.W0 52 /r	Dot-product of signed words with dword accumulation, 4 iterations
VP4DPWSSDS zmm1{k1}{z}, zmm2+3, m128	EVEX.512.F2.0F38.W0 53 /r	Dot-product of signed words with dword accumulation and saturation, 4 iterations

Xeon Phi processors (from Knights Landing onwards) also featured the PREFETCHWT1 m8 instruction (opcode 0F 0D /2, prefetch into L2 cache with intent to write) − these were the only Intel CPUs to officially support this instruction, but it continues to be supported on some non-Intel processors (e.g. Zhaoxin YongFeng).

== AMD instructions ==
=== Am386 SMM instructions ===
A handful of instructions to support System Management Mode were introduced in the Am386SXLV and Am386DXLV processors. They were also present in the later Am486SXLV/DXLV and Elan SC300/310 processors.

The SMM functionality of these processors was implemented using Intel ICE microcode without a valid license, resulting in a lawsuit that AMD lost in late 1994. As a result of this loss, the ICE microcode was removed from all later AMD CPUs, and the SMM instructions removed with it.

Instruction	Opcode	Description
SMI	F1	Call SMM interrupt handler (only if DR7 bit 12 is set; not available on Am486SXLV/DXLV)
UMOV r/m8, r8	0F 10 /r	Move data between registers and main system memory
UMOV r/m, r16/32	0F 11 /r	Move data between registers and main system memory
UMOV r8, r/m8	0F 12 /r	Move data between registers and main system memory
UMOV r16/32, r/m	0F 13 /r	Move data between registers and main system memory
RES3	0F 07	Return from SMM interrupt handler (Am386SXLV/DXLV only); Takes a pointer in ES:EDI to a processor save state to resume from − this save state has format nearly identical to that of the undocumented Intel 386 LOADALL instruction.
RES4	0F 07	Return from SMM interrupt handler (Am486SXLV/DXLV only). Similar to RES3, but with a different save state format.

These SMM instructions were also present on the IBM 386SLC and its derivatives (albeit with the LOADALL-like SMM return opcode 0F 07 named ICERET), as well as on the UMC U5S processor.

=== 3DNow! instructions ===
The 3DNow! instruction set extension was introduced in the AMD K6-2, mainly adding support for floating-point SIMD instructions using the MMX registers (two FP32 components in a 64-bit vector register). The instructions were mainly promoted by AMD, but were supported on some non-AMD CPUs as well. The processors supporting 3DNow! were:

- AMD K6-2, K6-III, and all processors based on the K7, K8 and K10 microarchitectures. (Later AMD microarchitectures such as Bulldozer, Bobcat and Zen do not support 3DNow!)
- IDT WinChip 2 and 3
- VIA Cyrix III (both "Joshua" and "Samuel" variants), and the "Samuel" and "Ezra" revisions of VIA C3. (Later VIA CPUs, from C3 "Nehemiah" onwards, dropped 3DNow! in favor of SSE.)
- National Semiconductor Geode GX2; AMD Geode GX and LX.

Instruction	Opcode	Instruction description	
PFADD mm1,mm2/m64	0F 0F /r 9E	Packed floating-point addition: dst <- dst + src	
PFSUB mm1,mm2/m64	0F 0F /r 9A	Packed floating-point subtraction: dst <- dst − src	
PFSUBR mm1,mm2/m64	0F 0F /r AA	Packed floating-point reverse subtraction: dst <- src − dst	
PFMUL mm1,mm2/m64	0F 0F /r B4	Packed floating-point multiplication: dst <- dst * src	
PFMAX mm1,mm2/m64	0F 0F /r A4	Packed floating-point maximum: dst <- (dst > src) ? dst : src	
PFMIN mm1,mm2/m64	0F 0F /r 94	Packed floating-point minimum: dst <- (dst < src) ? dst : src	
PFCMPEQ mm1,mm2/m64	0F 0F /r B0	Packed floating-point comparison, equal: dst <- (dst == src) ? 0xFFFFFFFF : 0	
PFCMPGE mm1,mm2/m64	0F 0F /r 90	Packed floating-point comparison, greater than or equal: dst <- (dst >= src) ? 0xFFFFFFFF : 0	
PFCMPGT mm1,mm2/m64	0F 0F /r A0	Packed floating-point comparison, greater than: dst <- (dst > src) ? 0xFFFFFFFF : 0	
PF2ID mm1,mm2/m64	0F 0F /r 1D	Converts packed floating-point operand to packed 32-bit signed integer, with round-to-zero	
PI2FD mm1,mm2/m64	0F 0F /r 0D	Packed 32-bit signed integer to floating-point conversion, with round-to-zero	
PFRCP mm1,mm2/m64	0F 0F /r 96	Floating-point reciprocal approximation (at least 14 bit precision): temp <- approx(1.0/src[31:0]) dst[31:0] <- temp dst[63:32] <- temp	The 3DNow! specification does not directly specify the operation performed by the PFRCPIT1, PFRSQIT1 and PFRCPIT2 instructions − instead, it imposes requirements on the results of using these instructions together in specific ways: (Note: The 3DNow! precision requirements can be fulfilled in several different ways, for example: On AMD K6-2, the PFRCPIT1, PFRSQIT1 and PFRCPIT2 instructions would perform various parts of a Newton-Raphson iteration to improve the precision of a low-precision initial result from PFRCP/PFRSQRT.; On AMD Geode LX, the PFRCP and PFRSQRT instructions would instead compute their results with full 24-bit precision − this made it possible to turn the PFRCPIT1, PFRSQIT1 and PFRCPIT2 instructions into pure data movement instructions, performing the same operation as MOVQ.) If the bottom 32 bits of mm0 initially contains a value X in FP32 format, then the instruction sequence: PFRCP mm1,mm0 PFRCPIT1 mm0,mm1 PFRCPIT2 mm0,mm1 must fill both 32-bit lanes of mm0 with $\frac{1.0}{X}$ in FP32 format, computed with an error of at most 1 ulp. Similarly, the instruction sequence: PFRSQRT mm1,mm0 MOVQ mm2,mm1 PFMUL mm1,mm1 PFRSQIT1 mm1,mm0 PFRCPIT2 mm1,mm2 must fill both 32-bit lanes of mm1 with $\frac{1.0}{\sqrt{X}}$ in FP32 format, computed with an error of at most 1 ulp.
PFRSQRT mm1,mm2/m64	0F 0F /r 97	Floating-point reciprocal square root approximation (at least 15 bit precision): temp <- approx(1.0/sqrt(src[31:0])) dst[31:0] <- temp dst[63:32] <- temp	
PFRCPIT1 mm1,mm2/m64	0F 0F /r A6	Packed floating-point reciprocal, first iteration step	
PFRSQIT1 mm1,mm2/m64	0F 0F /r A7	Packed floating-point reciprocal square root, first iteration step	
PFRCPIT2 mm1,mm2/m64	0F 0F /r B6	Packed floating-point reciprocal/reciprocal square root, second iteration step	
PFACC mm1,mm2/m64	0F 0F /r AE	Floating-point accumulate (horizontal add): dst[31:0] <- dst[31:0] + dst[63:32] dst[63:32] <- src[31:0] + src[63:32]	
PMULHRW mm1,mm2/m64, (Note: The 3DNow! PMULHRW instruction has the same mnemonic as the Cyrix EMMI PMULHRW instruction, however its opcode and function differ (the EMMI instruction right-shifts its multiply-result by 15 bits, while the 3DNow! instruction right-shifts by 16 bits). Some assemblers/disassemblers, such as NASM, resolve this ambiguity by using the mnemonic PMULHRWA for the 3DNow! instruction and PMULHRWC for the EMMI instruction.); PMULHRWA mm1,mm2/m64	0F 0F /r B7	Multiply signed packed 16-bit integers with rounding and store the high 16 bits: dst <- ((dst * src) + 0x8000) >> 16	
PAVGUSB mm1,mm2/m64	0F 0F /r BF	Average of unsigned packed 8-bit integers: dst <- (src+dst+1) >> 1	
FEMMS	0F 0E	Faster Enter/Exit of the MMX or x87 floating-point state (Note: The FEMMS instruction differs from the standard MMX EMMS instruction in that FEMMS makes the FP/MMX register contents undefined after the instruction is executed.)	

3DNow! also introduced a couple of prefetch instructions: PREFETCH m8 (opcode 0F 0D /0) and PREFETCHW m8 (opcode 0F 0D /1). These instructions, unlike the rest of 3DNow!, are not discontinued but continue to be supported on modern AMD CPUs. The PREFETCHW instruction is also supported on Intel CPUs starting with 65 nm Pentium 4, albeit executed as NOP until Broadwell.

==== 3DNow+ instructions added with Athlon and K6-2+ ====
Instruction	Opcode	Instruction description
PF2IW mm1,mm2/m64	0F 0F /r 1C	Packed 32-bit floating-point to 16-bit signed integer conversion, with round-to-zero (Note: The PF2IW and PI2FW instructions also existed as undocumented instructions on the original K6-2. The undocumented variant of PF2IW in K6-2 would set the top 16 bits of each 32-bit result lane to all-0s, while the documented variant in later processors would sign-extend the 16-bit result to 32 bits.)
PI2FW mm1,mm2/m64	0F 0F /r 0C	Packed 16-bit signed integer to 32-bit floating-point conversion
PSWAPD mm1,mm2/m64	0F 0F /r BB (Note: The PSWAPD instruction uses same opcode as the older undocumented K6-2 PSWAPW instruction.)	Packed Swap Doubleword: dst[31:0] <- src[63:32] dst[63:32] <- src[31:0]
PFNACC mm1,mm2/m64	0F 0F /r 8A	Packed Floating-Point Negative Accumulate: dst[31:0] <- dst[31:0] − dst[63:32] dst[63:32] <- src[31:0] − src[63:32]
PFPNACC mm1,mm2/m64	0F 0F /r 8E	Packed Floating-Point Positive-Negative Accumulate: dst[31:0] <- dst[31:0] − dst[63:32] dst[63:32] <- src[31:0] + src[63:32]

==== 3DNow! instructions specific to Geode GX and LX ====
Instruction	Opcode	Instruction description
PFRCPV mm1,mm2/m64	0F 0F /r 86	Packed Floating-point Reciprocal Approximation
PFRSQRTV mm1,mm2/m64	0F 0F /r 87	Packed Floating-point Reciprocal Square Root Approximation

=== SSE5 derived instructions ===
SSE5 was a proposed SSE extension by AMD, using a new "DREX" instruction encoding to add support for new 3-operand and 4-operand instructions to SSE. The bundle did not include the full set of Intel's SSE4 instructions, making it a competitor to SSE4 rather than a successor.

AMD chose not to implement SSE5 as originally proposed − it was instead reworked into FMA4 and XOP, which provided similar functionality but with a quite different instruction encoding − using the VEX prefix for the FMA4 instructions and the new VEX-like XOP prefix for most of the remaining instructions.

==== XOP instructions ====
Introduced with the Bulldozer processor core, removed again from Zen (microarchitecture) onward.

A revision of most of the SSE5 instruction set.

The XOP instructions mostly make use of the XOP prefix, which is a 3-byte prefix with the following layout:

	Byte 0	Byte 1								Byte 2							
Bits	7:0	7	6	5	4	3	2	1	0	7	6	5	4	3	2	1	0
Usage	8Fh	R̅	X̅	B̅	mmmmm					W	v̅v̅v̅v̅				L	pp	

where:

- Overlines indicate inverted bits.
- The R/X/B bits are argument extension bits similar to the RXB bits of the REX prefix.
- mmmmm is an opcode-map specifier. While capable of encoding values from 8 to 31 (values 0 to 7 map to ModR/M-encoded variants of the older POP instruction, making them unusable for XOP), only maps 8, 9 and 0Ah were ever used: map 8 for instructions that take an 8-bit immediate, map 9 for instructions that don't take an immediate, and map 0Ah for instructions that take a 32-bit immediate.
- W is used in a couple of different ways:
  - For XOP vector instructions, W is used to swap the last two vector source arguments to the instruction. For instructions that allow W=1, encodings with W=0 allow the second-to-last vector argument to be a memory argument, while encodings with W=1 allow the last vector argument to be a memory argument. For instructions that don't allow their last two vector arguments to be swapped, W is required to be 0.
  - For XOP-encoded integer-register instructions (the TBM and LWP instruction set extensions, see below), W is used for operand size. (0=32-bit, 1=64-bit)
- vvvv is an extra source register argument, normally the first non-r/m source argument for instructions with ≥3 register arguments.
- L is a vector length specifier. L=1 indicates 256-bit operation, L=0 indicates scalar or 128-bit operation.
- pp is an embedded prefix − nominally 0/1/2/3=none/66h/F2h/F3h, but only 0 was ever used with any of the instructions defined for the XOP prefix.

The XOP instructions encoded with the XOP prefix are as follows:

Instruction description		Instruction mnemonics	Opcode	W=1 swap allowed	L=1 (256b) allowed
Extract fractional portion of floating-point value.	Packed FP32	VFRCZPS ymm1,ymm2/m256	XOP.9 80 /r	No	Yes
Extract fractional portion of floating-point value.	Packed FP64	VFRCZPD ymm1,ymm2/m256	XOP.9 81 /r	No	Yes
Extract fractional portion of floating-point value.	Scalar FP32	VFRCZSS xmm1,xmm2/m32	XOP.9 82 /r	No	No
Extract fractional portion of floating-point value.	Scalar FP64	VFRCZSD xmm1,xmm2/m64	XOP.9 83 /r	No	No
Vector per-bit-lane conditional move. VPCMOV dst,src1,src2,src3 performs the equivalent of dst <- (src1 AND src3) OR (src2 AND NOT(src3))		VPCMOV ymm1,ymm2,ymm3/m256,ymm4	XOP.8 A2 /r /is4	Yes	Yes
Vector integer compare. For each vector-register lane, compare src1 to src2, then set destination to all-1s if the comparison passes, all-0s if it fails. The imm8 argument specifies comparison function to perform: 0: LT (less-than); 1: LE (less-than-or-equal); 2: GT (greater-than); 3: GE (greater-than-or-equal); 4: EQ (equal); 5: NE (not-equal); 6: FALSE (always-false); 7: TRUE (always-true)	Signed 8-bit lanes	VPCOMB xmm1,xmm2,xmm3/m128,imm8 (Note: For each VPCOM* instruction, a series of alias mnemonics are available for the instruction, one for each of the eight comparison functions encodable in the imm8 argument. These alias mnemonics specify the comparison to perform after the "VPCOM" part of the mnemonic. For example: VPCOMEQB xmm1,xmm2,xmm3 is an alias for VPCOMB xmm1,xmm2,xmm3,4; VPCOMFALSEUQ xmm1,xmm2,[ebx] is an alias for VPCOMUQ xmm1,xmm2,[ebx],6)	XOP.8 CC /r ib	No	No
Vector integer compare. For each vector-register lane, compare src1 to src2, then set destination to all-1s if the comparison passes, all-0s if it fails. The imm8 argument specifies comparison function to perform: 0: LT (less-than); 1: LE (less-than-or-equal); 2: GT (greater-than); 3: GE (greater-than-or-equal); 4: EQ (equal); 5: NE (not-equal); 6: FALSE (always-false); 7: TRUE (always-true)	Signed 16-bit lanes	VPCOMW xmm1,xmm2,xmm3/m128,imm8	XOP.8 CD /r ib	No	No
Vector integer compare. For each vector-register lane, compare src1 to src2, then set destination to all-1s if the comparison passes, all-0s if it fails. The imm8 argument specifies comparison function to perform: 0: LT (less-than); 1: LE (less-than-or-equal); 2: GT (greater-than); 3: GE (greater-than-or-equal); 4: EQ (equal); 5: NE (not-equal); 6: FALSE (always-false); 7: TRUE (always-true)	Signed 32-bit lanes	VPCOMD xmm1,xmm2,xmm3/m128,imm8	XOP.8 CE /r ib	No	No
Vector integer compare. For each vector-register lane, compare src1 to src2, then set destination to all-1s if the comparison passes, all-0s if it fails. The imm8 argument specifies comparison function to perform: 0: LT (less-than); 1: LE (less-than-or-equal); 2: GT (greater-than); 3: GE (greater-than-or-equal); 4: EQ (equal); 5: NE (not-equal); 6: FALSE (always-false); 7: TRUE (always-true)	Signed 64-bit lanes	VPCOMQ xmm1,xmm2,xmm3/m128,imm8	XOP.8 CF /r ib	No	No
Vector integer compare. For each vector-register lane, compare src1 to src2, then set destination to all-1s if the comparison passes, all-0s if it fails. The imm8 argument specifies comparison function to perform: 0: LT (less-than); 1: LE (less-than-or-equal); 2: GT (greater-than); 3: GE (greater-than-or-equal); 4: EQ (equal); 5: NE (not-equal); 6: FALSE (always-false); 7: TRUE (always-true)	Unsigned 8-bit lanes	VPCOMUB xmm1,xmm2,xmm3/m128,imm8	XOP.8 EC /r ib	No	No
Vector integer compare. For each vector-register lane, compare src1 to src2, then set destination to all-1s if the comparison passes, all-0s if it fails. The imm8 argument specifies comparison function to perform: 0: LT (less-than); 1: LE (less-than-or-equal); 2: GT (greater-than); 3: GE (greater-than-or-equal); 4: EQ (equal); 5: NE (not-equal); 6: FALSE (always-false); 7: TRUE (always-true)	Unsigned 16-bit lanes	VPCOMUW xmm1,xmm2,xmm3/m128,imm8	XOP.8 ED /r ib	No	No
Vector integer compare. For each vector-register lane, compare src1 to src2, then set destination to all-1s if the comparison passes, all-0s if it fails. The imm8 argument specifies comparison function to perform: 0: LT (less-than); 1: LE (less-than-or-equal); 2: GT (greater-than); 3: GE (greater-than-or-equal); 4: EQ (equal); 5: NE (not-equal); 6: FALSE (always-false); 7: TRUE (always-true)	Unsigned 32-bit lanes	VPCOMUD xmm1,xmm2,xmm3/m128,imm8	XOP.8 EE /r ib	No	No
Vector integer compare. For each vector-register lane, compare src1 to src2, then set destination to all-1s if the comparison passes, all-0s if it fails. The imm8 argument specifies comparison function to perform: 0: LT (less-than); 1: LE (less-than-or-equal); 2: GT (greater-than); 3: GE (greater-than-or-equal); 4: EQ (equal); 5: NE (not-equal); 6: FALSE (always-false); 7: TRUE (always-true)	Unsigned 64-bit lanes	VPCOMUQ xmm1,xmm2,xmm3/m128,imm8	XOP.8 EF /r ib	No	No
Vector Integer Horizontal Add. For each N-bit lane, split the lane into a series of M-bit lanes, add the M-bit lanes together, then store the result into the destination as an N-bit zero/sign-extended value.	2x8bit -> 16bit, signed	VPHADDBW xmm1,xmm2/m128	XOP.9 C1 /r	No	No
Vector Integer Horizontal Add. For each N-bit lane, split the lane into a series of M-bit lanes, add the M-bit lanes together, then store the result into the destination as an N-bit zero/sign-extended value.	4x8bit -> 32bit, signed	VPHADDBD xmm1,xmm2/m128	XOP.9 C2 /r	No	No
Vector Integer Horizontal Add. For each N-bit lane, split the lane into a series of M-bit lanes, add the M-bit lanes together, then store the result into the destination as an N-bit zero/sign-extended value.	8x8bit -> 64bit, signed	VPHADDBQ xmm1,xmm2/m128	XOP.9 C3 /r	No	No
Vector Integer Horizontal Add. For each N-bit lane, split the lane into a series of M-bit lanes, add the M-bit lanes together, then store the result into the destination as an N-bit zero/sign-extended value.	2x16bit -> 32bit, signed	VPHADDWD xmm1,xmm2/m128	XOP.9 C6 /r	No	No
Vector Integer Horizontal Add. For each N-bit lane, split the lane into a series of M-bit lanes, add the M-bit lanes together, then store the result into the destination as an N-bit zero/sign-extended value.	4x16bit -> 64bit, signed	VPHADDWQ xmm1,xmm2/m128	XOP.9 C7 /r	No	No
Vector Integer Horizontal Add. For each N-bit lane, split the lane into a series of M-bit lanes, add the M-bit lanes together, then store the result into the destination as an N-bit zero/sign-extended value.	2x32bit -> 64bit, signed	VPHADDDQ xmm1,xmm2/m128	XOP.9 CB /r	No	No
Vector Integer Horizontal Add. For each N-bit lane, split the lane into a series of M-bit lanes, add the M-bit lanes together, then store the result into the destination as an N-bit zero/sign-extended value.	2x8bit -> 16bit, unsigned	VPHADDUBW xmm1,xmm2/m128	XOP.9 D1 /r	No	No
Vector Integer Horizontal Add. For each N-bit lane, split the lane into a series of M-bit lanes, add the M-bit lanes together, then store the result into the destination as an N-bit zero/sign-extended value.	4x8bit -> 32bit, unsigned	VPHADDUBD xmm1,xmm2/m128	XOP.9 D2 /r	No	No
Vector Integer Horizontal Add. For each N-bit lane, split the lane into a series of M-bit lanes, add the M-bit lanes together, then store the result into the destination as an N-bit zero/sign-extended value.	8x8bit -> 64bit, unsigned	VPHADDUBQ xmm1,xmm2/m128	XOP.9 D3 /r	No	No
Vector Integer Horizontal Add. For each N-bit lane, split the lane into a series of M-bit lanes, add the M-bit lanes together, then store the result into the destination as an N-bit zero/sign-extended value.	2x16bit -> 32bit, unsigned	VPHADDUWD xmm1,xmm2/m128	XOP.9 D6 /r	No	No
Vector Integer Horizontal Add. For each N-bit lane, split the lane into a series of M-bit lanes, add the M-bit lanes together, then store the result into the destination as an N-bit zero/sign-extended value.	4x16bit -> 64bit, unsigned	VPHADDUWQ xmm1,xmm2/m128	XOP.9 D7 /r	No	No
Vector Integer Horizontal Add. For each N-bit lane, split the lane into a series of M-bit lanes, add the M-bit lanes together, then store the result into the destination as an N-bit zero/sign-extended value.	2x32bit -> 64bit, unsigned	VPHADDUDQ xmm1,xmm2/m128	XOP.9 DB /r	No	No
Vector Integer Horizontal Subtract. For each N-bit lane, split the lane into two signed sub-lanes of N/2 bits each, then subtract the upper lane from the lower lane, then store the result as a signed N-bit result.	2x8bit -> 16bit	VPHSUBBW xmm1,xmm2/m128	XOP.9 E1 /r	No	No
Vector Integer Horizontal Subtract. For each N-bit lane, split the lane into two signed sub-lanes of N/2 bits each, then subtract the upper lane from the lower lane, then store the result as a signed N-bit result.	2x16bit -> 32bit	VPHSUBWD xmm1,xmm2/m128	XOP.9 E2 /r	No	No
Vector Integer Horizontal Subtract. For each N-bit lane, split the lane into two signed sub-lanes of N/2 bits each, then subtract the upper lane from the lower lane, then store the result as a signed N-bit result.	2x32bit -> 64bit	VPHSUBDQ xmm1,xmm2/m128	XOP.9 E3 /r	No	No
Vector Signed Integer Multiply-Add. For each N-bit lane, perform dest <- src1*src2 + src3 For src1 and src2, the factors to multiply may be taken as signed values from the low half of each lane, high half of each lane or the lane in full (picked in the same way for src1 and src2) − the addend and the result use the full lane.	16-bit, full-lane	VPMACSWW xmm1,xmm2,xmm3/m128,xmm4	XOP.8 95 /r /is4	No	No
Vector Signed Integer Multiply-Add. For each N-bit lane, perform dest <- src1*src2 + src3 For src1 and src2, the factors to multiply may be taken as signed values from the low half of each lane, high half of each lane or the lane in full (picked in the same way for src1 and src2) − the addend and the result use the full lane.	32-bit, low-half	VPMACSWD xmm1,xmm2,xmm3/m128,xmm4	XOP.8 96 /r /is4	No	No
Vector Signed Integer Multiply-Add. For each N-bit lane, perform dest <- src1*src2 + src3 For src1 and src2, the factors to multiply may be taken as signed values from the low half of each lane, high half of each lane or the lane in full (picked in the same way for src1 and src2) − the addend and the result use the full lane.	64-bit, low-half	VPMACSDQL xmm1,xmm2,xmm3/m128,xmm4	XOP.8 97 /r /is4	No	No
Vector Signed Integer Multiply-Add. For each N-bit lane, perform dest <- src1*src2 + src3 For src1 and src2, the factors to multiply may be taken as signed values from the low half of each lane, high half of each lane or the lane in full (picked in the same way for src1 and src2) − the addend and the result use the full lane.	32-bit, full-lane	VPMACSDD xmm1,xmm2,xmm3/m128,xmm4	XOP.8 9E /r /is4	No	No
Vector Signed Integer Multiply-Add. For each N-bit lane, perform dest <- src1*src2 + src3 For src1 and src2, the factors to multiply may be taken as signed values from the low half of each lane, high half of each lane or the lane in full (picked in the same way for src1 and src2) − the addend and the result use the full lane.	64-bit, high-half	VPMACSDQH xmm1,xmm2,xmm3/m128,xmm4	XOP.8 9F /r /is4	No	No
Vector Signed Integer Multiply-Add. For each N-bit lane, perform dest <- src1*src2 + src3 For src1 and src2, the factors to multiply may be taken as signed values from the low half of each lane, high half of each lane or the lane in full (picked in the same way for src1 and src2) − the addend and the result use the full lane.	16-bit, full-lane, saturating	VPMACSSWW xmm1,xmm2,xmm3/m128,xmm4	XOP.8 85 /r /is4	No	No
Vector Signed Integer Multiply-Add. For each N-bit lane, perform dest <- src1*src2 + src3 For src1 and src2, the factors to multiply may be taken as signed values from the low half of each lane, high half of each lane or the lane in full (picked in the same way for src1 and src2) − the addend and the result use the full lane.	32-bit, low-half, saturating	VPMACSSWD xmm1,xmm2,xmm3/m128,xmm4	XOP.8 86 /r /is4	No	No
Vector Signed Integer Multiply-Add. For each N-bit lane, perform dest <- src1*src2 + src3 For src1 and src2, the factors to multiply may be taken as signed values from the low half of each lane, high half of each lane or the lane in full (picked in the same way for src1 and src2) − the addend and the result use the full lane.	64-bit, low-half, saturating	VPMACSSDQL xmm1,xmm2,xmm3/m128,xmm4	XOP.8 87 /r /is4	No	No
Vector Signed Integer Multiply-Add. For each N-bit lane, perform dest <- src1*src2 + src3 For src1 and src2, the factors to multiply may be taken as signed values from the low half of each lane, high half of each lane or the lane in full (picked in the same way for src1 and src2) − the addend and the result use the full lane.	32-bit, full-lane, saturating	VPMACSSDD xmm1,xmm2,xmm3/m128,xmm4	XOP.8 8E /r /is4	No	No
Vector Signed Integer Multiply-Add. For each N-bit lane, perform dest <- src1*src2 + src3 For src1 and src2, the factors to multiply may be taken as signed values from the low half of each lane, high half of each lane or the lane in full (picked in the same way for src1 and src2) − the addend and the result use the full lane.	64-bit, high-half, saturating	VPMACSSDQH xmm1,xmm2,xmm3/m128,xmm4	XOP.8 8F /r /is4	No	No
Packed multiply, add and accumulate signed word to signed doubleword. For each 32-bit lane, treat src1 and src2 as 2-component vectors of signed 16-bit values, then compute their dot-product, then add src3 as a 32-bit value.	with saturation	VPMADCSSWD xmm1,xmm2,xmm3/m128,xmm4	XOP.8 A6 /r /is4	No	No
Packed multiply, add and accumulate signed word to signed doubleword. For each 32-bit lane, treat src1 and src2 as 2-component vectors of signed 16-bit values, then compute their dot-product, then add src3 as a 32-bit value.	without saturation	VPMADCSWD xmm1,xmm2,xmm3/m128,xmm4	XOP.8 B6 /r /is4	No	No
Packed Permute Bytes. For VPPERM dst,src1,src2,src3, src2:src1 are considered a 32-element vector of bytes. For each byte-lane, the byte in src3 is used to index into this 32-byte vector and transform the element: bits 4:0 is used to pick one of the 32 bytes.; bits 7:6 specify a transform to perform on the byte (0=keep, 1=bitreverse, 2=set-to-zero, 3=replicate-MSB); bit 5, if set, inverts the result after the transform.		VPPERM xmm1,xmm2,xmm3/m128,xmm4	XOP.8 A3 /r /is4	Yes	No
Packed left-rotate. Rotation amount is given in the last source argument. It may be provided as an immediate or a vector register − in the latter case, the rotation amount is provided on a per-lane basis.	8-bit lanes	VPROTB xmm1,xmm2/m128,xmm3	XOP.9 90 /r	Yes	No
Packed left-rotate. Rotation amount is given in the last source argument. It may be provided as an immediate or a vector register − in the latter case, the rotation amount is provided on a per-lane basis.	8-bit lanes	VPROTB xmm1,xmm2/m128,imm8	XOP.8 C0 /r ib	No	No
Packed left-rotate. Rotation amount is given in the last source argument. It may be provided as an immediate or a vector register − in the latter case, the rotation amount is provided on a per-lane basis.	16-bit lanes	VPROTW xmm1,xmm2/m128,xmm3	XOP.9 91 /r	Yes	No
Packed left-rotate. Rotation amount is given in the last source argument. It may be provided as an immediate or a vector register − in the latter case, the rotation amount is provided on a per-lane basis.	16-bit lanes	VPROTW xmm1,xmm2/m128,imm8	XOP.8 C1 /r ib	No	No
Packed left-rotate. Rotation amount is given in the last source argument. It may be provided as an immediate or a vector register − in the latter case, the rotation amount is provided on a per-lane basis.	32-bit lanes	VPROTD xmm1,xmm2/m128,xmm3	XOP.9 92 /r	Yes	No
Packed left-rotate. Rotation amount is given in the last source argument. It may be provided as an immediate or a vector register − in the latter case, the rotation amount is provided on a per-lane basis.	32-bit lanes	VPROTD xmm1,xmm2/m128,imm8	XOP.8 C2 /r ib	No	No
Packed left-rotate. Rotation amount is given in the last source argument. It may be provided as an immediate or a vector register − in the latter case, the rotation amount is provided on a per-lane basis.	64-bit lanes	VPROTQ xmm1,xmm2/m128,xmm3	XOP.9 93 /r	Yes	No
Packed left-rotate. Rotation amount is given in the last source argument. It may be provided as an immediate or a vector register − in the latter case, the rotation amount is provided on a per-lane basis.	64-bit lanes	VPROTQ xmm1,xmm2/m128,imm8	XOP.8 C3 /r ib	No	No
Packed shift, with signed shift-amounts. Shift-amount is provided on a per-vector-lane basis, and is taken from the bottom 8 bits of each lane of the last source argument. The shift-amount is considered signed − a positive value will cause left-shift, while a negative value causes right-shift.	8-bit, signed	VPSHAB xmm1,xmm2/m128,xmm3	XOP.9 98 /r	Yes	No
Packed shift, with signed shift-amounts. Shift-amount is provided on a per-vector-lane basis, and is taken from the bottom 8 bits of each lane of the last source argument. The shift-amount is considered signed − a positive value will cause left-shift, while a negative value causes right-shift.	16-bit, signed	VPSHAW xmm1,xmm2/m128,xmm3	XOP.9 99 /r	Yes	No
Packed shift, with signed shift-amounts. Shift-amount is provided on a per-vector-lane basis, and is taken from the bottom 8 bits of each lane of the last source argument. The shift-amount is considered signed − a positive value will cause left-shift, while a negative value causes right-shift.	32-bit, signed	VPSHAD xmm1,xmm2/m128,xmm3	XOP.9 9A /r	Yes	No
Packed shift, with signed shift-amounts. Shift-amount is provided on a per-vector-lane basis, and is taken from the bottom 8 bits of each lane of the last source argument. The shift-amount is considered signed − a positive value will cause left-shift, while a negative value causes right-shift.	64-bit, signed	VPSHAQ xmm1,xmm2/m128,xmm3	XOP.9 9B /r	Yes	No
Packed shift, with signed shift-amounts. Shift-amount is provided on a per-vector-lane basis, and is taken from the bottom 8 bits of each lane of the last source argument. The shift-amount is considered signed − a positive value will cause left-shift, while a negative value causes right-shift.	8-bit, unsigned	VPSHLB xmm1,xmm2/m128,xmm3	XOP.9 94 /r	Yes	No
Packed shift, with signed shift-amounts. Shift-amount is provided on a per-vector-lane basis, and is taken from the bottom 8 bits of each lane of the last source argument. The shift-amount is considered signed − a positive value will cause left-shift, while a negative value causes right-shift.	16-bit, unsigned	VPSHLW xmm1,xmm2/m128,xmm3	XOP.9 95 /r	Yes	No
Packed shift, with signed shift-amounts. Shift-amount is provided on a per-vector-lane basis, and is taken from the bottom 8 bits of each lane of the last source argument. The shift-amount is considered signed − a positive value will cause left-shift, while a negative value causes right-shift.	32-bit, unsigned	VPSHLD xmm1,xmm2/m128,xmm3	XOP.9 96 /r	Yes	No
Packed shift, with signed shift-amounts. Shift-amount is provided on a per-vector-lane basis, and is taken from the bottom 8 bits of each lane of the last source argument. The shift-amount is considered signed − a positive value will cause left-shift, while a negative value causes right-shift.	64-bit, unsigned	VPSHLQ xmm1,xmm2/m128,xmm3	XOP.9 97 /r	Yes	No

XOP also included two vector instructions that used the VEX prefix instead of the XOP prefix:

Instruction description	Instruction mnemonics	Opcode	W=1 swap allowed	L=1 (256b) allowed
Permute two-source double-precision floating-point values.	VPERMIL2PD ymm1,ymm2,ymm3/m256,ymm4,imm4	VEX.NP.0F3A 49 /r /is4	Yes	Yes
Permute two-source single-precision floating-point values.	VPERMIL2PS ymm1,ymm2,ymm3/m256,ymm4,imm4	VEX.NP.0F3A 48 /r /is4	Yes	Yes

The instructions VPERMIL2PD and VPERMIL2PS were originally defined by Intel in early drafts of the AVX specification – they were removed in later drafts and were never implemented in any Intel processor. They were, however, implemented by AMD, who designated them as being a part of the XOP instruction set extension. (Like the other parts of XOP, they've been removed in AMD Zen.)

==== FMA4 instructions ====
Supported in AMD processors starting with the Bulldozer architecture, removed in Zen. Not supported by any Intel chip as of 2023.

Fused multiply-add with four operands. FMA4 was realized in hardware before FMA3.

Instruction	Opcode	Meaning	Notes
VFMADDPD xmm0, xmm1, xmm2, xmm3	C4E3 WvvvvL01 69 /r /is4	Fused Multiply-Add of Packed Double-Precision Floating-Point Values	
VFMADDPS xmm0, xmm1, xmm2, xmm3	C4E3 WvvvvL01 68 /r /is4	Fused Multiply-Add of Packed Single-Precision Floating-Point Values	
VFMADDSD xmm0, xmm1, xmm2, xmm3	C4E3 WvvvvL01 6B /r /is4	Fused Multiply-Add of Scalar Double-Precision Floating-Point Values	
VFMADDSS xmm0, xmm1, xmm2, xmm3	C4E3 WvvvvL01 6A /r /is4	Fused Multiply-Add of Scalar Single-Precision Floating-Point Values	
VFMADDSUBPD xmm0, xmm1, xmm2, xmm3	C4E3 WvvvvL01 5D /r /is4	Fused Multiply-Alternating Add/Subtract of Packed Double-Precision Floating-Point Values	
VFMADDSUBPS xmm0, xmm1, xmm2, xmm3	C4E3 WvvvvL01 5C /r /is4	Fused Multiply-Alternating Add/Subtract of Packed Single-Precision Floating-Point Values	
VFMSUBADDPD xmm0, xmm1, xmm2, xmm3	C4E3 WvvvvL01 5F /r /is4	Fused Multiply-Alternating Subtract/Add of Packed Double-Precision Floating-Point Values	
VFMSUBADDPS xmm0, xmm1, xmm2, xmm3	C4E3 WvvvvL01 5E /r /is4	Fused Multiply-Alternating Subtract/Add of Packed Single-Precision Floating-Point Values	
VFMSUBPD xmm0, xmm1, xmm2, xmm3	C4E3 WvvvvL01 6D /r /is4	Fused Multiply-Subtract of Packed Double-Precision Floating-Point Values	
VFMSUBPS xmm0, xmm1, xmm2, xmm3	C4E3 WvvvvL01 6C /r /is4	Fused Multiply-Subtract of Packed Single-Precision Floating-Point Values	
VFMSUBSD xmm0, xmm1, xmm2, xmm3	C4E3 WvvvvL01 6F /r /is4	Fused Multiply-Subtract of Scalar Double-Precision Floating-Point Values	
VFMSUBSS xmm0, xmm1, xmm2, xmm3	C4E3 WvvvvL01 6E /r /is4	Fused Multiply-Subtract of Scalar Single-Precision Floating-Point Values	
VFNMADDPD xmm0, xmm1, xmm2, xmm3	C4E3 WvvvvL01 79 /r /is4	Fused Negative Multiply-Add of Packed Double-Precision Floating-Point Values	
VFNMADDPS xmm0, xmm1, xmm2, xmm3	C4E3 WvvvvL01 78 /r /is4	Fused Negative Multiply-Add of Packed Single-Precision Floating-Point Values	
VFNMADDSD xmm0, xmm1, xmm2, xmm3	C4E3 WvvvvL01 7B /r /is4	Fused Negative Multiply-Add of Scalar Double-Precision Floating-Point Values	
VFNMADDSS xmm0, xmm1, xmm2, xmm3	C4E3 WvvvvL01 7A /r /is4	Fused Negative Multiply-Add of Scalar Single-Precision Floating-Point Values	
VFNMSUBPD xmm0, xmm1, xmm2, xmm3	C4E3 WvvvvL01 7D /r /is4	Fused Negative Multiply-Subtract of Packed Double-Precision Floating-Point Values	
VFNMSUBPS xmm0, xmm1, xmm2, xmm3	C4E3 WvvvvL01 7C /r /is4	Fused Negative Multiply-Subtract of Packed Single-Precision Floating-Point Values	
VFNMSUBSD xmm0, xmm1, xmm2, xmm3	C4E3 WvvvvL01 7F /r /is4	Fused Negative Multiply-Subtract of Scalar Double-Precision Floating-Point Values	
VFNMSUBSS xmm0, xmm1, xmm2, xmm3	C4E3 WvvvvL01 7E /r /is4	Fused Negative Multiply-Subtract of Scalar Single-Precision Floating-Point Values	

=== Trailing Bit Manipulation Instructions ===
AMD introduced TBM together with BMI1 in its Piledriver line of processors; later AMD Jaguar and Zen-based processors do not support TBM. No Intel processors (as of 2023) support TBM.

The TBM instructions are all encoded using the XOP prefix. They are all available in 32-bit and 64-bit forms, selected with the XOP.W bit (0=32bit, 1=64bit). (XOP.W is ignored outside 64-bit mode.) Like all instructions encoded with VEX/XOP prefixes, they are unavailable in Real Mode and Virtual-8086 mode.

Instruction	Opcode	Description	Equivalent C expression
BEXTR reg,r/m,imm32	XOP.A 10 /r imm32	Bit field extract (immediate form) (Note: For BEXTR, a register form is available as part of BMI1.) The imm32 is interpreted as follows: Bit 7:0 : start position; Bit 15:8 : length; Bit 31:16 : ignored	(src >> start) & ((1 << len) − 1)
BLCFILL reg,r/m	XOP.9 01 /1	Fill from lowest clear bit	x & (x + 1)
BLCI reg,r/m	XOP.9 02 /6	Isolate lowest clear bit	x | ~(x + 1)
BLCIC reg,r/m	XOP.9 01 /5	Isolate lowest clear bit and complement	~x & (x + 1)
BLCMSK reg,r/m	XOP.9 02 /1	Mask from lowest clear bit	x ^ (x + 1)
BLCS reg,r/m	XOP.9 01 /3	Set lowest clear bit	x | (x + 1)
BLSFILL reg,r/m	XOP.9 01 /2	Fill from lowest set bit	x | (x − 1)
BLSIC reg,r/m	XOP.9 01 /6	Isolate lowest set bit and complement	~x | (x − 1)
T1MSKC reg,r/m	XOP.9 01 /7	Inverse mask from trailing ones	~x | (x + 1)
TZMSK reg,r/m	XOP.9 01 /4	Mask from trailing zeros	~x & (x − 1)

=== Lightweight Profiling instructions ===
The AMD Lightweight Profiling (LWP) feature was introduced in AMD Bulldozer and removed in AMD Zen. On all supported CPUs, the latest available microcode updates have disabled LWP due to Spectre mitigations.

These instructions are available in Ring 3, but not available in Real Mode and Virtual-8086 mode. All of them use the XOP prefix.

Instruction	Opcode	Description
LLWPCB r32/64	XOP.9 12 /0	Load LWPCB (Lightweight Profiling Control Block) address. (Note: The address used by LLWPCB and SLWPCB is an effective-address, specified relative to the DS: segment base address. LLWPCB converts this effective-address to a linear-address by adding the DS base address to it, and SLWPCB converts it back by subtracting the DS base address. Changing the DS base address while LWP is enabled will thereby cause SLWPCB to return a different address than what was specified to LLWPCB, and may also cause XSAVE to fail to save LWP state properly.) Loading an address of 0 disables LWP. Loading a nonzero address will cause the CPU to perform validation of the specified LWPCB, then enable LWP if the validation passed. If LWP was already enabled, state for the previous LWPCB is flushed to memory.
SLWPCB r32/64	XOP.9 12 /1	Store LWPCB address to register, and flush LWP state to memory. If LWP is not enabled, the stored address is 0.
LWPINS r32/64, r/m32, imm32	XOP.A 12 /0 imm32	Insert user event record with EventID=255 in LWP ring buffer. The arguments are inserted into the event record as follows: The first argument is stored in bytes 23:16 (zero-extended if 32-bit); The second argument is stored in bytes 7:4; The low 16 bits of the imm32 are stored in bytes 3:2 (the high 16 bits are ignored); The LWPINS instruction sets CF=1 if LWP is enabled and the ring buffer is full, CF=0 otherwise.
LWPVAL r32/64, r/m32, imm32	XOP.A 12 /1 imm32	Decrement the event counter associated with the programmed value sample event. If the resulting counter value ends up negative, insert an event record with EventID=1 in LWP ring buffer. (The instruction arguments are inserted in this record in the same way as for LWPINS.) Executes as NOP if LWP is not enabled or if the event counter is not enabled. If no event record is inserted, then the second argument (which may be a memory argument) is not accessed.

== Instructions from other vendors ==
=== Instructions specific to NEC V-series processors ===
These instructions are specific to the NEC V20/V30 CPUs and their successors, and do not appear in any non-NEC CPUs. Many of their opcodes have been reassigned to other instructions in later non-NEC CPUs.

NEC V-series instructions
Instruction	Opcode	Description		Available on
TEST1 r/m8, CL; TEST1 r/m16, CL	0F 10 /0; 0F 11 /0	Test one bit. Sets FLAGS.ZF to 0 if the bit is set, 1 otherwise. First argument specifies an 8/16-bit register or memory location to test a bit in. Second argument specifies which bit to test.		All V-series except V30MZ
TEST1 r/m8, imm8 TEST1 r/m16, imm8	0F 18 /0 ib 0F 19 /0 ib	Test one bit. Sets FLAGS.ZF to 0 if the bit is set, 1 otherwise. First argument specifies an 8/16-bit register or memory location to test a bit in. Second argument specifies which bit to test.		All V-series except V30MZ
CLR1 r/m8, CL; CLR1 r/m16, CL	0F 12 /0; 0F 13 /0	Clear one bit.		All V-series except V30MZ
CLR1 r/m8, imm8 CLR1 r/m16, imm8	0F 1A /0 ib 0F 1B /0 ib	Clear one bit.		All V-series except V30MZ
SET1 r/m8, CL; SET1 r/m16, CL	0F 14 /0; 0F 15 /0	Set one bit.		All V-series except V30MZ
SET1 r/m8, imm8 SET1 r/m16, imm8	0F 1C /0 ib 0F 1D /0 ib	Set one bit.		All V-series except V30MZ
NOT1 r/m8, CL; NOT1 r/m16, CL	0F 16 /0; 0F 17 /0	Invert one bit.		All V-series except V30MZ
NOT1 r/m8, imm8 NOT1 r/m16, imm8	0F 1E /0 ib 0F 1F /0 ib	Invert one bit.		All V-series except V30MZ
ADD4S	0F 20	Add Nibble Strings. Performs a string addition of integers in packed BCD format (2 BCD digits per byte). DS:SI points to a source integer, ES:DI to a destination integer, and CL provides the number of digits to add. The operation is then: destination ← destination + source		All V-series except V30MZ
SUB4S	0F 22	Subtract Nibble Strings. destination ← destination − source		All V-series except V30MZ
CMP4S	0F 26	Compare Nibble Strings.		All V-series except V30MZ
ROL4 r/m8	0F 28 /0	Rotate Left Nibble. Concatenates its 8-bit argument with the bottom 4 bits of AL to form a 12-bit bitvector, then left-rotates this bitvector by 4 bits, then writes this bitvector back to its argument and the bottom 4 bits of AL.		All V-series except V30MZ
ROR4 r/m8	0F 2A /0	Rotate Right Nibble. Similar to ROL4, except performs a right-rotate by 4 bits.		All V-series except V30MZ
REPC	64	Repeat if carry. Instruction prefix for use with CMPS/SCAS.		All V-series except V30MZ
REPNC	65	Repeat if not carry. Instruction prefix for use with CMPS/SCAS.		All V-series except V30MZ
FPO2	66 /r 67 /r	"Floating Point Operation 2": extra escape opcodes for floating-point coprocessor, in addition to the standard D8-DF ones used for x87. The FPO2 escape opcodes are used by the NEC 72291 floating-point coprocessor – this coprocessor also uses the standard D8-DF escape opcodes, but uses them to encode an instruction set that is unique to the 72291 and not compatible with x87. A listing of the opcodes/instructions supported by the 72291 is available.		All V-series except V30MZ
EXT r8,r8	0F 33 /r	Bitfield extract. Perform a bitfield read from memory. DS:SI (DS0:IX in NEC nomenclature) points to memory location to read from, first argument specifies bit-offset to read from, and second argument specifies the number of bits to read minus 1. The result is placed in AX. After the bitfield read, SI and the first argument are updated to point just beyond the just-read bitfield.		All V-series except V30MZ and μPD9002.
EXT r8,imm8	0F 3B /0 ib	Bitfield extract. Perform a bitfield read from memory. DS:SI (DS0:IX in NEC nomenclature) points to memory location to read from, first argument specifies bit-offset to read from, and second argument specifies the number of bits to read minus 1. The result is placed in AX. After the bitfield read, SI and the first argument are updated to point just beyond the just-read bitfield.		All V-series except V30MZ and μPD9002.
INS r8,r8	0F 31 /r	Bitfield Insert. Perform a bitfield write to memory. ES:DI (DS1:IY in NEC nomenclature) points to memory location to write to, AX contains data to write, first argument specifies bit-offset to write to, and second argument specifies the number of bits to write minus 1. After the bitfield write, DI and the first argument are updated to point just beyond the just-written bitfield.		All V-series except V30MZ and μPD9002.
INS r8,imm8	0F 39 /0 ib	Bitfield Insert. Perform a bitfield write to memory. ES:DI (DS1:IY in NEC nomenclature) points to memory location to write to, AX contains data to write, first argument specifies bit-offset to write to, and second argument specifies the number of bits to write minus 1. After the bitfield write, DI and the first argument are updated to point just beyond the just-written bitfield.		All V-series except V30MZ and μPD9002.
BRKEM imm8	0F FF ib	Break to 8080 emulation mode. (Note: The Intel 8080 emulation mode of NEC V20/V30/V40/V50 supports the following NEC-specific instructions in addition to the basic 8080 instruction set: Instruction / Opcode / Description; CALLN imm8 / ED ED ib / Call to native mode; RETEM / ED FD / Return from 8080 emulation mode; These instructions are also available in the Zilog Z80 emulation mode of the NEC μPD9002.) Jump to an address picked from the IVT (Interrupt Vector Table) using the imm8 argument, similar to the 8086 INT instruction, but start executing as Intel 8080 code rather than x86 code.		V20, V30, V40, V50, V41, V51
BRKEM2 imm8, BRKFEM imm8	0F FE ib	Break to Zilog Z80 emulation mode. Similar to V20/V30's BRKEM, but starts executing code as Zilog Z80 code instead of Intel 8080 code.		μPD9002
BRKXA imm8	0F E0 ib	Break to Extended Address Mode. Jump to an address picked from the IVT using the imm8 argument. Enables a simple memory paging mechanism after reading the IVT but before executing the jump. The paging mechanism uses an on-chip page table with 16Kbyte pages and no access rights checking, making it usable for up to 16 MB of LIM EMS expanded memory.		V33, V53
RETXA imm8	0F F0 ib	Return from Extended Address Mode. Jump to an address picked from the IVT using the imm8 argument. Disables paging after reading the IVT but before executing the jump.		V33, V53
MOVSPA	0F 25	Transfer both SS and SP of old register bank after the bank has been switched by an interrupt or BRKCS instruction.		V25, V35, V55
BRKCS r16	0F 2D /0	Perform software interrupt with context switch to register bank specified by low bits of register argument. (Note: For the BRKCS, TSKSW and MOVSPB instructions, the bottom 3 bits are used to select register bank on NEC V25/V35; on NEC V55, the bottom 4 bits are used.)		V25, V35, V55
RETRBI	0F 91	Return from register bank context switch interrupt.		V25, V35, V55
FINT	0F 92	Finish Interrupt.		V25, V35, V55
TSKSW r16	0F 94 /7	Perform task switch to register bank indicated by low bits of register argument.		V25, V35, V55
MOVSPB r16	0F 95 /7	Transfer SS and SP of current register bank to register bank indicated by low bits of register argument.		V25, V35, V55
BTCLR imm8,imm8,cb	0F 9C ib ib rel8	Bit Test and Clear. The first argument specifies a V25/V35 Special Function Register to test a bit in. The second argument specifies a bit position in that register. The third argument specifies a short branch offset. If the bit was set to 1, then it is cleared and a short branch is taken, else the branch is not taken.		V25, V35, V55
STOP	0F 9E	CPU Halt. Differs from the conventional 8086 HLT instruction in that the clock is stopped too, so that an NMI or CPU reset is needed to resume operation.		V25, V35, V55
BRKS imm8	F1 ib	Break and Enable Software Guard. Jump to an address picked from the IVT using the imm8 argument, and then continue execution with "Software Guard" enabled. The "Software Guard" is an 8-bit Substitution cipher that, during instruction fetch/decode, translates opcode bytes using a 256-entry lookup table stored in an on-chip Mask ROM.		V25, V35 "Software Guard"
BRKN imm8	63 ib	Break and Enable Native Mode. Similar to BRKS, excepts disables "Software Guard" rather than enabling it.		V25, V35 "Software Guard"
MOV r/m,DS3	8C /6	Move to/from the DS2 and DS3 extended segment registers. The DS2 and DS3 registers (which are specific to the NEC V55) act similar to regular x86 real mode segment registers except that they are left-shifted by 8 rather than 4, enabling access to 16MB of memory. Block transfer instructions, such as MOVSW ("MOVBKW" in NEC nomenclature), can access the 16MB memory space by simultaneously prefixing with DS2 and DS3.		V55
MOV r/m,DS2	8C /7	Move to/from the DS2 and DS3 extended segment registers. The DS2 and DS3 registers (which are specific to the NEC V55) act similar to regular x86 real mode segment registers except that they are left-shifted by 8 rather than 4, enabling access to 16MB of memory. Block transfer instructions, such as MOVSW ("MOVBKW" in NEC nomenclature), can access the 16MB memory space by simultaneously prefixing with DS2 and DS3.		V55
MOV DS3,r/m	8E /6	Move to/from the DS2 and DS3 extended segment registers. The DS2 and DS3 registers (which are specific to the NEC V55) act similar to regular x86 real mode segment registers except that they are left-shifted by 8 rather than 4, enabling access to 16MB of memory. Block transfer instructions, such as MOVSW ("MOVBKW" in NEC nomenclature), can access the 16MB memory space by simultaneously prefixing with DS2 and DS3.		V55
MOV DS2,r/m	8E /7	Move to/from the DS2 and DS3 extended segment registers. The DS2 and DS3 registers (which are specific to the NEC V55) act similar to regular x86 real mode segment registers except that they are left-shifted by 8 rather than 4, enabling access to 16MB of memory. Block transfer instructions, such as MOVSW ("MOVBKW" in NEC nomenclature), can access the 16MB memory space by simultaneously prefixing with DS2 and DS3.		V55
PUSH DS3	0F 76	Move to/from the DS2 and DS3 extended segment registers. The DS2 and DS3 registers (which are specific to the NEC V55) act similar to regular x86 real mode segment registers except that they are left-shifted by 8 rather than 4, enabling access to 16MB of memory. Block transfer instructions, such as MOVSW ("MOVBKW" in NEC nomenclature), can access the 16MB memory space by simultaneously prefixing with DS2 and DS3.		V55
POP DS3	0F 77	Move to/from the DS2 and DS3 extended segment registers. The DS2 and DS3 registers (which are specific to the NEC V55) act similar to regular x86 real mode segment registers except that they are left-shifted by 8 rather than 4, enabling access to 16MB of memory. Block transfer instructions, such as MOVSW ("MOVBKW" in NEC nomenclature), can access the 16MB memory space by simultaneously prefixing with DS2 and DS3.		V55
PUSH DS2	0F 7E	Move to/from the DS2 and DS3 extended segment registers. The DS2 and DS3 registers (which are specific to the NEC V55) act similar to regular x86 real mode segment registers except that they are left-shifted by 8 rather than 4, enabling access to 16MB of memory. Block transfer instructions, such as MOVSW ("MOVBKW" in NEC nomenclature), can access the 16MB memory space by simultaneously prefixing with DS2 and DS3.		V55
POP DS2	0F 7F	Move to/from the DS2 and DS3 extended segment registers. The DS2 and DS3 registers (which are specific to the NEC V55) act similar to regular x86 real mode segment registers except that they are left-shifted by 8 rather than 4, enabling access to 16MB of memory. Block transfer instructions, such as MOVSW ("MOVBKW" in NEC nomenclature), can access the 16MB memory space by simultaneously prefixing with DS2 and DS3.		V55
MOV DS3,r16,m32	0F 36 /r	Instructions to load both extended segment register and general-purpose register at once (similar to 8086's LDS and LES instructions).		V55
MOV DS2,r16,m32	0F 3E /r	Instructions to load both extended segment register and general-purpose register at once (similar to 8086's LDS and LES instructions).		V55
DS2:	63	Segment-override prefixes for the DS2 and DS3 extended segments. When used with string instructions such as MOVBKW, the DS2: prefix overrides the DS segment, while the DS3: prefix overrides the ES segment.		V55
DS3:	D6	Segment-override prefixes for the DS2 and DS3 extended segments. When used with string instructions such as MOVBKW, the DS2: prefix overrides the DS segment, while the DS3: prefix overrides the ES segment.		V55
IRAM:	F1	Register File Override Prefix. Will cause memory operands to index into the NEC V55 processor's 512-byte "Register File" space rather than general memory.		V55
BSCH r/m8 BSCH r/m16	0F 3C /0; 0F 3D /0	Count Trailing Zeroes and store result in CL. Sets ZF=1 for all-0s input.		V55
RSTWDT imm8,imm8	0F 96 ib ib	Watchdog Timer Manipulation Instruction.		V55
BTCLRL imm8,imm8,cb	0F 9D ib ib rel8	Bit test and clear for second bank of special purpose registers (similar to BTCLR).		V55
QHOUT imm16	0F E0 iw	Remove queue element from head of queue.	Queue manipulation instructions (instructions to manipulate a doubly linked list in memory.) The imm16 argument provides a pointer to an 8-byte block of four arguments in the NEC V55's "Register File" space, with the four 16-bit arguments in the block referred to as P0,P1,P2 and P3: P1:P0 point to a queue head/tail pointer pair in memory; P2 is the segment of a queue item to add or remove (provided as input to the QTIN and QOUT instructions, returned as output from the QHOUT instruction); P3 is an offset to a pair of next/back pointers within each queue item in memory.	V55
QOUT imm16	0F E1 iw	Remove queue element from anywhere in queue.		V55
QTIN imm16	0F E2 iw	Add queue element to end of queue.		V55
ALBIT	0F 9A	Data transmission instruction.	Dedicated fax compression instructions.	V55PI
COLTRP	0F 9B	Store 1 line pixel data change point information in change point table (start white run length).	Dedicated fax compression instructions.	V55PI
MHENC	0F 93	Generate MH code from change point table.	Dedicated fax compression instructions.	V55PI
MRENC	0F 97	Generate MR code from change point table.	Dedicated fax compression instructions.	V55PI
SCHEOL	0F 78	"EOL" detection in MH/MR code.	Dedicated fax expansion instructions.	V55PI
GETBIT	0F 79	Fetch pixel data start bit and set it to CY flag.	Dedicated fax expansion instructions.	V55PI
MHDEC	0F 7C	Generate change point table from MH code.	Dedicated fax expansion instructions.	V55PI
MRDEC	0F 7D	Generate change point table from MR code.	Dedicated fax expansion instructions.	V55PI
CNVTRP	0F 7A	Convert 1 line change point information in change point table to pixel data.	Dedicated fax expansion instructions.	V55PI
IDLE	0F 9F	Put CPU in idle mode.		V55SC
(no mnemonic)	63	Designated opcode for termination of the x86 emulation mode on the NEC V60.		V60, V70

=== Instructions specific to Cyrix and Geode CPUs ===
These instructions are present in Cyrix CPUs as well as NatSemi/AMD Geode CPUs derived from Cyrix microarchitectures (Geode GX and LX, but not NX). They are also present in Cyrix manufacturing partner CPUs from IBM, ST and TI, as well as the VIA Cyrix III ("Joshua" core only, not "Samuel") and a few SoCs such as STPC ATLAS and ZFMicro ZFx86. Many of these opcodes have been reassigned to other instructions in later non-Cyrix CPUs.

Instruction	Opcode	Description	Available on
SVDC m80,sreg	0F 78 /r	Save segment register and descriptor to memory as a 10-byte data structure. The first 8 bytes are the descriptor, the last two bytes are the selector.	System Management Mode instructions. (Note: The Cyrix SMM instructions also include RSM (0F AA; Return from System Management mode), however, RSM is not a Cyrix-specific instruction, and it continues to exist in modern non-Cyrix x86 processors.) Not present on stepping A of Cx486SLC and Cx486DLC. Present on Cx486SLC/e and all later Cyrix CPUs. Present on all Cyrix-derived Geode CPUs.
RSDC sreg,m80 (Note: RSDC with CS as a destination register is only supported on NatSemi Geode GX2 and AMD Geode GX/LX – on other processors, it causes #UD.)	0F 79 /r	Restore segment register and descriptor from memory	System Management Mode instructions. Not present on stepping A of Cx486SLC and Cx486DLC. Present on Cx486SLC/e and all later Cyrix CPUs. Present on all Cyrix-derived Geode CPUs.
SVLDT m80	0F 7A /0	Save LDTR and descriptor	System Management Mode instructions. Not present on stepping A of Cx486SLC and Cx486DLC. Present on Cx486SLC/e and all later Cyrix CPUs. Present on all Cyrix-derived Geode CPUs.
RSLDT m80	0F 7B /0	Restore LDTR and descriptor	System Management Mode instructions. Not present on stepping A of Cx486SLC and Cx486DLC. Present on Cx486SLC/e and all later Cyrix CPUs. Present on all Cyrix-derived Geode CPUs.
SVTS m80	0F 7C /0	Save TSR and descriptor	System Management Mode instructions. Not present on stepping A of Cx486SLC and Cx486DLC. Present on Cx486SLC/e and all later Cyrix CPUs. Present on all Cyrix-derived Geode CPUs.
RSTS m80	0F 7D /0	Restore TSR and descriptor	System Management Mode instructions. Not present on stepping A of Cx486SLC and Cx486DLC. Present on Cx486SLC/e and all later Cyrix CPUs. Present on all Cyrix-derived Geode CPUs.
SMINT (Note: Some assemblers/disassemblers, such as NASM, use the instruction mnemonic SMINTOLD for the 0F 7E encoding.)	0F 7E	System management software interrupt. Uses 0F 7E encoding on Cyrix 486, 5x86, 6x86 and ZFx86. Uses 0F 38 encoding on Cyrix 6x86MX, MII, MediaGX and Geode.	Cyrix 486S and later processors – not available on older Cyrix 486SLC/DLC/SRx2/DRx2 processors. Not available on any Ti486 processors.
SMINT	0F 38	System management software interrupt. Uses 0F 7E encoding on Cyrix 486, 5x86, 6x86 and ZFx86. Uses 0F 38 encoding on Cyrix 6x86MX, MII, MediaGX and Geode.	Cyrix 486S and later processors – not available on older Cyrix 486SLC/DLC/SRx2/DRx2 processors. Not available on any Ti486 processors.
RDSHR r/m32	0F 36 /0 (Note: For the RDSHR and WRSHR instructions, Cyrix's documentation specifies that the instruction accepts a ModR/M byte but does not specify the encoding of the ModR/M byte's reg field. NASM v0.98.31 and later uses /0 for these instructions, while sandpile.org's opcode tables indicate that the reg field is ignored for these instructions.)	Read SMM Header Pointer Register	Cyrix 6x86MX and MII VIA Cyrix III
WRSHR r/m32	0F 37 /0	Write SMM Header Pointer Register	Cyrix 6x86MX and MII VIA Cyrix III
BB0_RESET	0F 3A	Reset BLT Buffer Pointer 0 to base	Cyrix MediaGX and MediaGXm NatSemi Geode GXm, GXLV, GX1
BB1_RESET	0F 3B	Reset BLT Buffer Pointer 1 to base	Cyrix MediaGX and MediaGXm NatSemi Geode GXm, GXLV, GX1
CPU_WRITE	0F 3C	Write to CPU internal special register (EBX=register-index, EAX=data)	Cyrix MediaGX and MediaGXm NatSemi Geode GXm, GXLV, GX1
CPU_READ	0F 3D	Read from CPU internal special register (EBX=register-index, EAX=data)	Cyrix MediaGX and MediaGXm NatSemi Geode GXm, GXLV, GX1
DMINT	0F 39	Debug Management Mode Interrupt	NatSemi Geode GX2 AMD Geode GX, LX
RDM	0F 3A	Return from Debug Management Mode	NatSemi Geode GX2 AMD Geode GX, LX

==== Cyrix EMMI instructions ====
These instructions were introduced in the Cyrix 6x86MX and MII processors, and were also present in the MediaGXm and Geode GX1 processors. (In later non-Cyrix processors, all of their opcodes have been used for SSE or SSE2 instructions.)

These instructions are integer SIMD instructions acting on 64-bit vectors in MMX registers or memory. Each instruction takes two explicit operands, where the first one is an MMX register operand and the second one is either a memory operand or a second MMX register. In addition, several of the instructions take an implied operand, which is an MMX register implied from the first operand as follows:

First explicit operand	mm0	mm1	mm2	mm3	mm4	mm5	mm6	mm7
Implied operand	mm1	mm0	mm3	mm2	mm5	mm4	mm7	mm6

In the instruction descriptions in the below table, arg1 and arg2 refer to the two explicit operands of the instruction, and imp to the implied operand.

Instruction	Opcode	Description	
PAVEB mm,mm/m64	0F 50 /r	Packed average bytes: (Note: Implementations differ on whether the PAVEB instruction treats the bytes as signed or unsigned.) arg1 <- (arg1+arg2) >> 1	
PADDSIW mm,mm/m64	0F 51 /r	Packed add signed words with saturation, using implied destination: imp <- saturate_s16(arg1+arg2)	
PMAGW mm,mm/m64	0F 52 /r	Packed signed word magnitude maximum value: if (abs(arg2) > abs(arg1)) then arg1 <- arg2	
PDISTIB mm,m64 (Note: For PDISTIB, PMACHRIW and the PMV* instructions, the second explicit operand is required to be a memory operand − register operands are not supported.)	0F 54 /r	Packed unsigned byte distance and accumulate to implied destination, with saturation: imp <- saturate_u8(imp + (abs(arg1-arg2)))	
PSUBSIW mm,mm/m64	0F 55 /r	Packed subtract signed words with saturation, using implied destination: imp <- saturate_s16(arg1-arg2)	
PMULHRW mm,mm/m64, (Note: The Cyrix EMMI PMULHRW instruction has the same mnemonic as the 3DNow! PMULHRW instruction, however its opcode and function differ (the EMMI instruction right-shifts its multiply-result by 15 bits, while the 3DNow! instruction right-shifts by 16 bits). Some assemblers/disassemblers, such as NASM, resolve this ambiguity by using the mnemonic PMULHRWA for the 3DNow! instruction and PMULHRWC for the EMMI instruction.); PMULHRWC mm,mm/m64	0F 59 /r	Packed signed word multiply high with rounding: arg1 <- (arg1*arg2+0x4000)>>15	
PMULHRIW mm,mm/m64	0F 5D /r	Packed signed word multiply high with rounding and implied destination: imp <- (arg1*arg2+0x4000)>>15	
PMACHRIW mm,m64	0F 5E /r	Packed signed word multiply high with rounding and accumulation to implied destination: imp <- imp + ((arg1*arg2+0x4000)>>15)	
PMVZB mm,m64	0F 58 /r	if (imp == 0) then arg1 <- arg2	Packed conditional load from memory to MMX register. Condition is evaluated on a per-byte-lane basis, by comparing byte lanes in the implied source to zero (with signed compare) − if the comparison passes, then the corresponding destination lane is loaded from memory, otherwise it keeps its original value.
PMVNZB mm,m64	0F 5A /r	if (imp != 0) then arg1 <- arg2	Packed conditional load from memory to MMX register. Condition is evaluated on a per-byte-lane basis, by comparing byte lanes in the implied source to zero (with signed compare) − if the comparison passes, then the corresponding destination lane is loaded from memory, otherwise it keeps its original value.
PMVLZB mm,m64	0F 5B /r	if (imp < 0) then arg1 <- arg2	Packed conditional load from memory to MMX register. Condition is evaluated on a per-byte-lane basis, by comparing byte lanes in the implied source to zero (with signed compare) − if the comparison passes, then the corresponding destination lane is loaded from memory, otherwise it keeps its original value.
PMVGEZB mm,m64	0F 5C /r	if (imp >= 0) then arg1 <- arg2	Packed conditional load from memory to MMX register. Condition is evaluated on a per-byte-lane basis, by comparing byte lanes in the implied source to zero (with signed compare) − if the comparison passes, then the corresponding destination lane is loaded from memory, otherwise it keeps its original value.

=== Instructions specific to VIA Technologies CPUs ===
All VIA C3 processors support the VIA AIS (Alternate Instruction Set). The x86 instructions present in these processors to support AIS are:

Instruction	Opcode	Description
JMPAI EAX	0F 3F	Near Jump to address in EAX, and enter Alternate Instruction mode.
AI uop32	8D 84 00 imm32	Alternate instruction wrapper opcode ("Samuel"/"Ezra" variants of C3 – repurposes the instruction encoding for LEA EAX,[EAX+EAX+disp32]) 32-bit immediate is treated as a 32-bit instruction of the RISC-like Alternate Instruction Set. An instruction set reference is available.
AI uop32	62 80 imm32	Alternate instruction wrapper opcode ("Nehemiah" variants of C3 – repurposes the instruction encoding for BOUND EAX,[EAX+disp32])

These instructions are not present in VIA C7 or any later VIA processor.

=== Instructions specific to Chips and Technologies CPUs ===
The C&T F8680 PC/Chip is a system-on-a-chip featuring an 80186-compatible CPU core, with a few additional instructions to support the F8680-specific "SuperState R" supervisor/system-management feature. Some of the added instructions for "SuperState R" are:

Instruction	Opcode	Description
LFEAT AX	FE F8	Load datum into F8680 "CREG" configuration register (AH=register-index, AL=datum)
STFEAT AL,imm8	FE F0 ib	Read F8680 status register into AL (imm8=register-index)

C&T also developed a 386-compatible processor known as the Super386. This processor supports, in addition to the basic Intel 386 instruction set, a number of instructions to support the Super386-specific "SuperState V" system-management feature. The added instructions for "SuperState V" are:

Instruction	Opcode	Description
SCALL r/m	0F 18 /0	Call SMM interrupt handler
SRET	0F 19	Return from SMM interrupt handler
SRESUME	0F 1A	Return from SMM with interrupts disabled for one instruction
SVECTOR	0F 1B	Exit from SMM and issue a shutdown cycle
EPIC	0F 1E	Load one of the six interrupt or I/O traps
RARF1	0F 3C	Read from bank 1 of the register file (includes visible and invisible CPU registers)
RARF2	0F 3D	Read from bank 2 of the register file
RARF3	0F 3E	Read from bank 3 of the register file
LTLB	0F F0	Load TLB with page table entry
RCT	0F F1	Read cache tag
WCT	0F F2	Write cache tag
RCD	0F F3	Read cache data
WCD	0F F4	Write cache data
RTLBPA	0F F5	Read TLB data (physical address)
RTLBLA	0F F6	Read TLB tag (linear address)
LCFG	0F F7	Load configuration register
SCFG	0F F8	Store configuration register
RGPR	0F F9	Read general-purpose register or any bank of register file
RARF0	0F FA	Read from bank 0 of the register file
RARFE	0F FB	Read from extra bank of the register file
WGPR	0F FD	Write general-purpose register or any bank of register file
WARFE	0F FE	Write extra bank of the register file

=== Instructions specific to ALi/Nvidia/DM&P M6117 MCUs ===
The M6117 series of embedded microcontrollers feature an Intel 386SX compatible CPU core derived from V.M. Technology (VMT) VM386SX+ processor. VMT VM386SX+ adds a few processor specific additions to the Intel 386 instruction set. The ones documented for DM&P M6117D are:

Instruction	Opcode	Description
BRKPM	F1	System management interrupt − enters "hyper state mode"
RETPM	D6 E6	Return from "hyper state mode"
LDUSR UGRS,EAX	D6 CA 03 A0	Set page address of SMI entry point
(mnemonic not listed)	D6 C8 03 A0	Read page address of SMI entry point
MOV PWRCR,EAX	D6 FA 03 02	Write to power control register

== Instructions present in specific 80387 clones ==
Several 80387-class floating-point coprocessors provided extra instructions in addition to the standard 80387 ones − none of these are supported in later processors:

Instruction	Opcode	Description	Available on
FRSTPM	DB F4	FPU Reset Protected Mode. Instruction to signal to the FPU that the main CPU is exiting protected mode, similar to how the FSETPM instruction is used to signal to the FPU that the CPU is entering protected mode.	Intel 287XL
FNSTDW AX	DF E1	Store FPU Device Word to AX (Note: The FNSTDW AX and FNSTSG AX instructions should be executed immediately after an F(N)INIT, before any instructions that can modify the x87 FPU status word. Executing them after the x87 status word has been modified produced undefined results.)	Intel 387SL
FNSTSG AX	DF E2	Store FPU Signature Register to AX (Note: The FNSTSG AX instruction can be executed not just on the Intel 387SL FPU but on the Intel 387SX as well – executing the instruction immediately after an FNINIT will cause the instruction to return 0000h on 387SX, but a nonzero signature value on the 387SL.)	Intel 387SL
FSBP0	DB E8	Select Coprocessor Register Bank 0	IIT 2c87, 3c87
FSBP1	DB EB	Select Coprocessor Register Bank 1	IIT 2c87, 3c87
FSBP2	DB EA	Select Coprocessor Register Bank 2	IIT 2c87, 3c87
FSBP3	DB E9	Select Coprocessor Register Bank 3 (undocumented, not functional)	IIT 2c87, 3c87
F4X4, FMUL4X4	DB F1	Multiply 4-component vector with 4x4 matrix. For proper operation, the matrix must be preloaded into Coprocessor Register banks 1 and 2 (unique to IIT FPUs), and the vector must be loaded into Coprocessor Register Bank 0. Example code is available.	IIT 2c87, 3c87
FTSTP	D9 E6	Equivalent to FTST followed by a stack pop.	Cyrix EMC87, 83s87, 83d87, 387+
FRINT2	DB FC	Round st(0) to integer, with round-to-nearest ties-away-from-zero rounding.	Cyrix EMC87, 83s87, 83d87, 387+
FRICHOP	DD FC	Round st(0) to integer, with round-to-zero rounding.	Cyrix EMC87, 83s87, 83d87, 387+
FRINEAR	DF FC	Round st(0) to integer, with round-to-nearest-even rounding.	Cyrix EMC87, 83s87, 83d87, 387+

== See also ==
- List of x86 instructions
