= Evex =

Evex may refer to:

- Esterified estrogens, by brand name
- EVEX prefix
