= ModR/M =

Instruction encoding rule for the x86 instruction set

The ModR/M byte is an important part of instruction encoding for the x86 instruction set.

== Description ==
Opcodes in x86 are generally one-byte, though two-byte instructions and prefixes exist. ModR/M is a byte that, if required, follows the opcode and specifies zero, one, or two operands for the instruction.

The format is:

Bit	7	6	5	4	3	2	1	0
Usage	"Mod"		"Reg"			"R/M"		

The "reg" field, if specifying an operand, encodes the three least-significant bits of a register index. Which register (general purpose, AVX, etc.) depends on the instruction being executed. Instructions which take only one operand typically do not use this field, but instead repurpose the bits as an "opcode extension", allowing eight instructions to share a single opcode byte. In opcode listings, these are specified by following the opcode with a slash (/) and a digit 0–7. For example, the opcode for byte increment is FE /0, while for byte decrement it is FE /1.

The "mod" field specifies the addressing mode for the register/memory ("r/m") operand. If the "mod" field is 11_{2}, the "r/m" field encodes a register in the same manner as the "reg" field. However, if the "mod" field is anything else (00_{2}, 01_{2}, or 10_{2}), the "r/m" field specifies the size of the displacement in a memory addressing mode. The interpretation of these five bits differs between 16- and 32-/64-bit addressing modes.

In 16-bit mode, the eight possible values of the "r/m" field specify a base register as follows:

- 000: [BX + SI + disp]
- 001: [BX + DI + disp]
- 010: [BP + SI + disp]
- 011: [BP + DI + disp]
- 100: [SI + disp]
- 101: [DI + disp]
- 110: [BP + disp]
- 111: [BX + disp]

where "disp" is the 0-, 8- or 16-bit displacement specified by the "mod" bits.

As a special exception, the combination mod=00_{2}, r/m=110_{2}, which would normally specify [BP + disp0], instead specifies a 16-bit address [disp16] with no register base at all. To address [BP+0], one must use a 1-byte displacement ("disp8") form with a displacement of 0.

This results in the full set of combinations:

x86 Mod & R/M encoding, 16-bit mode
R/M	MOD			
R/M	00	01 (Note: When the MOD=01 encoding is used in the ModR/M byte of an AVX-512 or AVX10 instruction encoded with an EVEX prefix, the displacement encoded in the instruction's disp8 byte will be scaled. The scaling factor used will usually be given by the memory operand size (although some exceptions exist, e.g. the VGATHER*, VSCATTER*, VCOMPRESS*, VEXPAND* instructions, which use the single-element size as scaling factor). For example, the instruction encoding 62 f1 7d 48 6f 47 01 (with the EVEX prefix in italics and ModR/M byte in bold) in 64-bit mode encodes the instruction vmovdqa32 zmm0,[rdi+0x40], which loads a 64-byte vector from memory and therefore gets its disp8 byte 01 multiplied with 64. This scaling is only applied to 8-bit displacements — 16-bit and 32-bit displacements are not scaled. For instructions that only received new EVEX-encoded instruction forms with the introduction of Intel APX (such as e.g. IDIV, LDTILECFG and KMOVW), disp8 scaling is not performed.)	10	11
000	[BX+SI]	[BX+SI+disp8]	[BX+SI+disp16]	AL / AX
001	[BX+DI]	[BX+DI+disp8]	[BX+DI+disp16]	CL / CX
010	[BP+SI]	[BP+SI+disp8]	[BP+SI+disp16]	DL / DX
011	[BP+DI]	[BP+DI+disp8]	[BP+DI+disp16]	BL / BX
100	[SI]	[SI+disp8]	[SI+disp16]	AH / SP
101	[DI]	[DI+disp8]	[DI+disp16]	CH / BP
110	[disp16]	[BP+disp8]	[BP+disp16]	DH / SI
111	[BX]	[BX+disp8]	[BX+disp16]	BH / DI

The 16-bit addressing modes may be thought of as any combination of:

- a base register: BX, BP, or nothing;
- an index register: SI, DI, or nothing; and
- a displacement: 0, 8 or 16 bits long.

The resultant 3×3×3 = 27 combinations are reduced to 24 encodings by omitting three forms which have longer equivalents:

- [BP+disp0]: use [BP+disp8] with disp8=0 instead.
- [disp8]: use [disp16] instead.
- [disp0]: use [disp16] with disp16=0 instead.

In 32-bit mode, there are many differences. First, the MOD=10 case specifies a 32-bit displacement (disp32). Second, the R/M field specifies only a single base register, using the same encoding as the REG field. There are two exceptions:

- Like in 16-bit mode, the [EBP + disp0] encoding (which is MOD=00 R/M=101 in 32-bit mode) is usurped for a bare disp32. The [EBP+0] address must use the [EBP+disp8] encoding with disp8 set to 0.
- The encoding MOD≠11 R/M=100 does not specify [ESP] as a base as one would expect, but instead specifies an § SIB byte is present, and the resultant SCALE*INDEX+BASE value should be used to compute the address.

x86 Mod & R/M encoding, 32-bit mode
R/M	MOD			
R/M	00	01	10	11
000	[EAX]	[EAX+disp8]	[EAX+disp32]	AL / AX / EAX
001	[ECX]	[ECX+disp8]	[ECX+disp32]	CL / CX / ECX
010	[EDX]	[EDX+disp8]	[EDX+disp32]	DL / DX / EDX
011	[EBX]	[EBX+disp8]	[EBX+disp32]	BL / BX / EBX
100	[SIB]	[SIB+disp8]	[SIB+disp32]	AH / SP / ESP
101	[disp32]	[EBP+disp8]	[EBP+disp32]	CH / BP / EBP
110	[ESI]	[ESI+disp8]	[ESI+disp32]	DH / SI / ESI
111	[EDI]	[EDI+disp8]	[EDI+disp32]	BH / DI / EDI

The combination MOD=00 R/M=100, which specifies a SIB byte with no displacement, has a similar special case if the base register is coded as 101 (EBP). In that case, the base register is omitted but a word displacement is used, producing a [SCALE*INDEX+disp32] addressing mode.

== SIB byte ==
The SIB byte is an optional post-opcode byte in x86 assembly on the i386 and later, used for complex addressing. If present, it appears immediately after the ModR/M byte, before any displacements.

SIB bytes are formatted similarly to ModR/M bytes, and take the form of (scale * index) + base + displacement, where the SCALE is 1, 2, 4, or 8. BASE and INDEX each encode a register. The displacement is a constant offset, whose size is given by the MOD field as usual, which encoded after the SIB byte and added to the final address.

The general format is as follows:

Bit	7	6	5	4	3	2	1	0
Usage	SCALE		INDEX			BASE		

However, there are two exceptions:

- An INDEX of ESP is forbidden. The encoding INDEX=100 denotes a zero index irrespective of the SCALE field. (Note: On some early x86 processors, such as Intel 386 and 486 and all Cyrix processors, a SIB-byte encoded with INDEX=100 (no index) and the SCALE field set to a nonzero value would result in an undefined effective-address. On at least some Intel 386 processors, such encodings have been observed to cause the SCALE to be applied to the BASE instead of the INDEX - while left undocumented on the Intel 386, Chips & Technologies documented this BASE-scaling behavior for their Super386 processor. On newer Intel processors, from the P5 Pentium onwards, this combination is no longer undefined — if INDEX=100, the SCALE field is ignored and the effective address is computed as if SCALE was 0.) (Note: Some assemblers/disassemblers (such as gas/objdump from GNU Binutils version 2.19 or later) support the use of the eiz/riz pseudo-register to indicate an address encoding that uses a SIB-byte with INDEX=100. (eiz is used for 32-bit addressing, riz for 64-bit.) For example, in 32-bit mode, the instruction encoding 8D 74 26 00 may disassemble to, or be assembled from lea esi,[esi+eiz*1+0x0].) Normally, an addressing mode without an index would simply use a bare ModR/M byte without a SIB byte at all, but this is necessary to encode an ESP-relative address ([esp]/[esp+disp8/32]).
- When MOD=00, a BASE of 101 which would specify EBP with zero displacement, instead specifies no base register and a 32-bit displacement. If EBP with zero displacement is desired, it must be encoded using an 8-bit displacement value of 0. This is analogous to the treatment of the MOD=00 BASE=101 case.

In 64-bit mode, MOD=00 BASE=101 is reassigned to encode RIP-relative addresses ([rip+disp32]), so an absolute address ([disp32]) must be encoded using a SIB byte with both of those exceptions. If BASE=101, the M bit in the REX prefix doesn't affect RIP-relative addressing since RIP-relative address calculation produces a 64-bit address.

=== Special SIB byte addressing modes ===
For most instructions that accept a ModR/M byte, encodings with the SIB byte will result in the computation of a single effective address as (scale * index) + base + displacement as described above. However, some newer x86 instruction set extensions have added instructions that use the SIB byte in other, more specialized ways:

- VSIB addressing. Under VSIB addressing, the INDEX field of the SIB byte is not used to look up one of the general-purpose registers, but instead one of the xmm/ymm/zmm vector registers. The vector register is then treated as a vector of either (sign-extended) 32-bit indexes or 64-bit indexes - the (scale * index) + base + displacement effective address calculation is then done for each of the indexes in the vector. This addressing mode is used for scatter/gather instructions, such as the VGATHER* instructions introduced with AVX2 and the VSCATTER* instructions introduced with AVX-512.
- MIB addressing. Under MIB addressing, the base and displacement are used to compute an effective address as base + displacement. The register specified by the SIB byte's INDEX field does not participate in this effective address calculation, but is instead treated as a separate input argument to the instructions using this addressing mode. This addressing mode is used for the Intel MPX instructions BNDLDX and BNDSTX.
- SIBMEM addressing. This addressing mode is used for instructions that perform a sequence of strided memory accesses. The effective address to use for the first of these accesses is given by base + displacement - the stride to add to this effective-address for each subsequent access is given by (scale * index). This addressing mode is used for the Intel AMX instructions TILELOADD, TILELOADDT1 and TILESTORED.

For all the instructions that use VSIB, MIB or SIBMEM addressing, the SIB byte is mandatory - instruction encodings without the SIB byte will cause #UD (invalid instruction exception). (Note: For the instructions that use VSIB/MIB/SIBMEM addressing, the requirement for a SIB byte means that these instructions cannot be encoded with 16-bit address-size or with RIP-relative addressing - such encodings will, like other SIB-less encodings, cause #UD.) For VSIB addressing, the INDEX=100 case is not treated specially (it will cause xmm4/ymm4/zmm4 to be used as index register); other than that, the INDEX=100 and the MOD=00 BASE=101 special cases work for VSIB/MIB/SIBMEM addressing in the same way as for regular SIB addressing.

== 64-bit changes ==
AMD's 64-bit extension to the original instruction set make relatively few changes to 32-bit addressing, with the most significant being that in long mode, 64-bit addressing is the default. 64-bit registers (RAX, RBX, RCX, etc.) are used rather than 32-bit registers for address computation. The displacement is not widened to 64 bits; MOD=10 continues to specify a 32-bit displacement, which is sign-extended to 64 bits. It may be changed with the address size override prefix 0x67, which changes to 32-bit addressing for the following instruction.

The second major addition is the REX prefix. In long mode, opcodes whose highest four bits are 0100 (decimal 4) are a REX prefix, which provide an additional bit for each register field of the following instruction, doubling the number of available processor registers from eight to sixteen. Specifically, the four low-order bits are:

- W: If set, the operation is performed on 64-bit operands.
- R: Extends the REG field to 4 bits.
- X: Extends the INDEX field of the SIB byte (if present) to 4 bits.
- B: Extends the R/M field (or the SIB byte's BASE if MOD≠11 R/M=100) to 4 bits.

There is one additional effect of a REX prefix: a REX prefix changes how byte registers are addressed. Without a prefix, the available byte registers are AL/CL/DL/BL, then AH/CH/DH/BH. When a REX prefix is present, even a REX prefix of 01000000, byte instructions consistently address the low byte of the corresponding word registers, so the available byte become AL/CL/DL/BL/SPL/BPL/SIL/DIL.

The third significant change is RIP-relative addressing. The MOD=00 R/M=101 encoding, which specifies an absolute 32-bit address (with no base register) in 32-bit mode, specifies [RIP+disp32] in long mode. With an address-size override prefix, this becomes [EIP+disp32]. The absolute [disp32] mode may be obtained by using MOD=00 R/M=100 to force use of a SIB byte, followed by a SIB byte with BASE=101 and INDEX=100.

For the special-case addressing encodings R/M=100 (to force a SIB byte), MOD=00 R/M=101 (substitute RIP+disp32), and MOD=00 R/M=100 BASE=101 (substitute disp32), the REX.B prefix is not considered; these special-case encodings apply to registers R12 (binary 1100) and R13 (binary 1101) as well, and the same slightly longer encodings must be used. This is because these exceptions change the encoded instruction size, so they must be decoded very quickly so that the following instruction may be located.

The special case where INDEX=100 suppresses the index register since scaling RSP is forbidden. This special case does respect the REX.X bit, only applying when the full INDEX=0100, so it is possible to scale R12 (INDEX=1100). This is for two reasons:

1. There is no alternative way to encode indexing with R12, so this would be a serious limitation, and
2. The exception changes the computed address but not the encoded instruction size, so there is more time in the instruction pipeline to resolve the special case.

== See also ==
- List of x86 instructions
