= Epson ActionNote =

Series of laptop computers

ActionNote
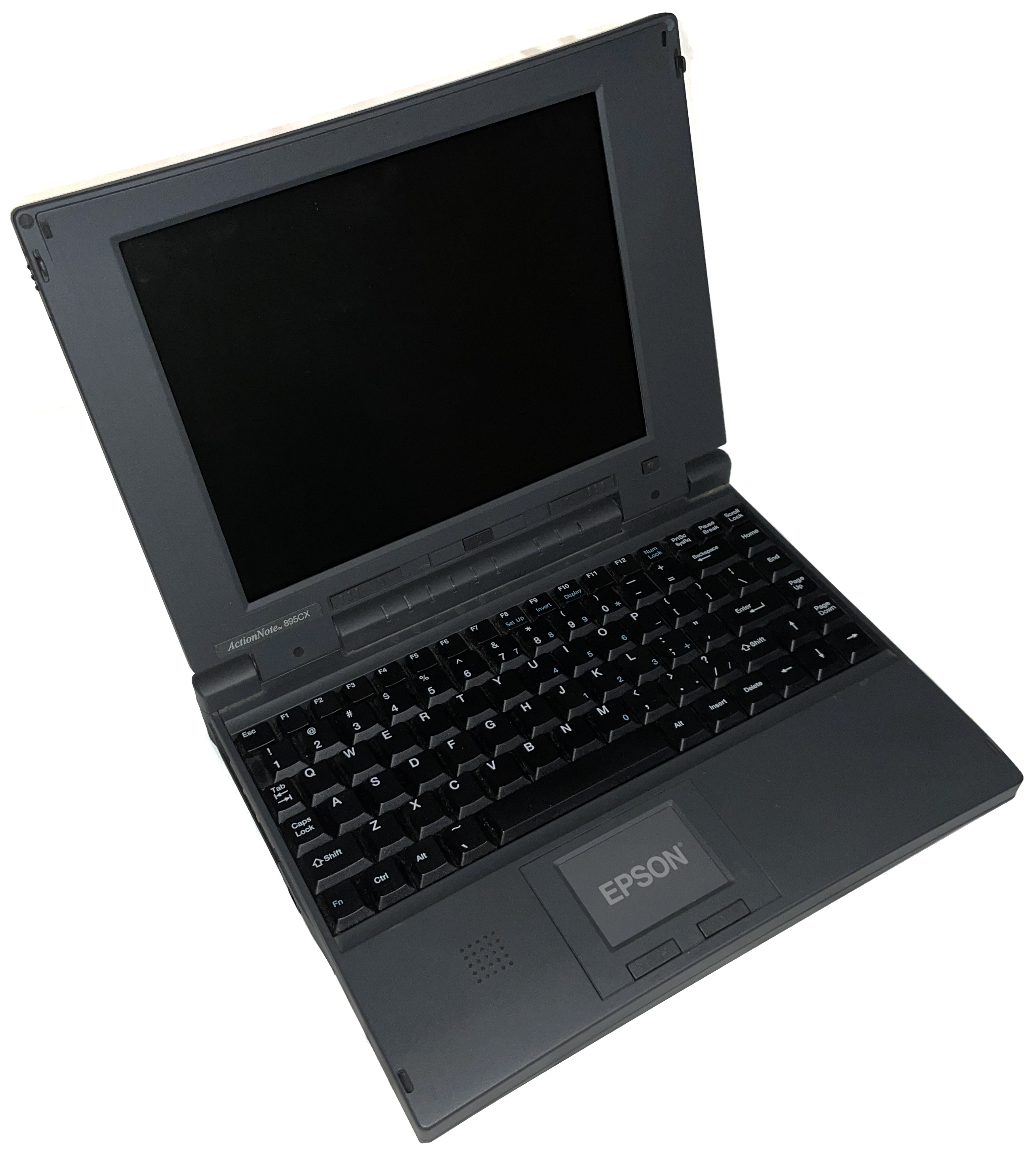
- ActionNote 895CX
- Developer: Epson America
- Manufacturer: Epson America; ASE Technologies; Compal (650 and 660 series); Jabil Circuit (700 series only)
- Type: Laptop (notebook)
- Released: April 1993
- Lifespan: 1993–96

The ActionNote was a series of notebook-sized laptops developed by Epson America in 1993. The series was Epson's answer to the small businesses and home office market for laptops and initially ran alongside their corporate-oriented NB series of laptops. The series was segmented into premium and low-cost offerings and included a subnotebook, the ActionNote 4000. The bulk of the laptops' manufacturing was performed by ASE Technologies of Taiwan, with the exception of the 650 and 660 series, which were produced by Compal, and the short-lived initial entries into the 700 series, which were produced by Jabil Circuit. The ActionNote received mixed, mostly positive, reception in its lifespan before Epson America silently left the international personal computer market in 1996.

== Development and specifications ==
Epson, which is sometimes credited for being the first to market a notebook computer with the HX-20 in 1982, introduced the ActionNote series in April 1993. Development for the ActionNote was led by Sanford Weisman, portable computer product manager at Epson America, who was also instrumental in the design of the company's earlier NB series of laptops. In response to criticism that the purported piecemeal replacement of the NB line with the ActionNote would cause the company to fall further behind in laptop innovations, Weisman said that NB would continue to be marketed simultaneously with the ActionNote—the former being sold to large businesses through reseller networks and the latter to small businesses and home office buyers through retailers. All entries in the ActionNote line came preinstalled with MS-DOS and Microsoft Windows, starting with Windows 3.1 for the 4SLC-25, Windows 3.11 for the 700 series, and Windows 95 with the 660 and 880 series.

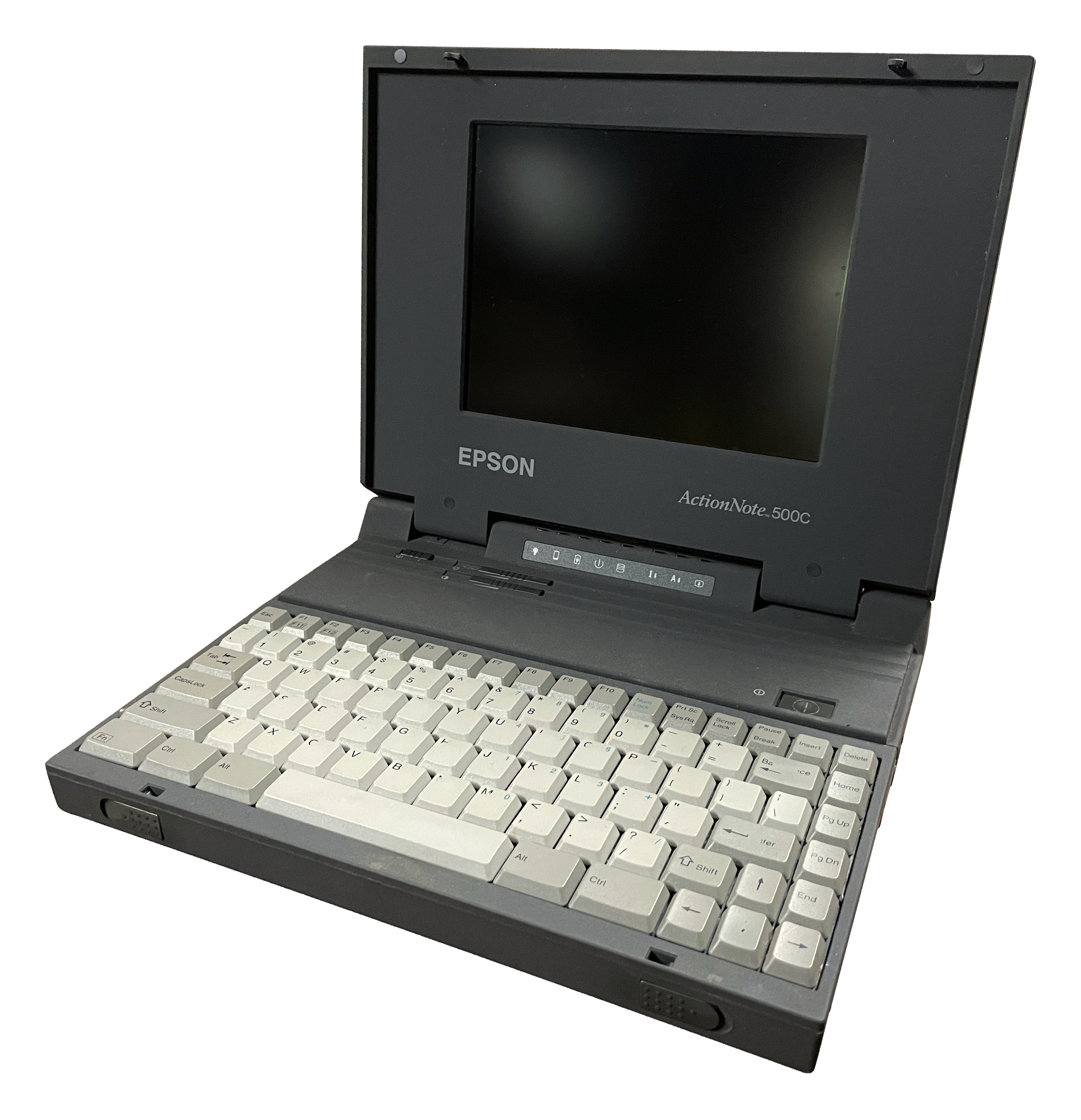
ActionNote 500C

Epson used Cyrix's microprocessors exclusively for the ActionNote. The first laptop in the series, the ActionNote 4SLC-25, was released in April 1993 and featured a 486SLC with a clock speed of 25 MHz, later bumped to 33 MHz and 50 MHz. The ActionNote 4000, released in July 1993, sported a subnotebook form factor and had a 486SLC clocked at 33 MHz. In February 1994, Epson introduced the 500C and 700 series ActionNotes. The former introduced a color display to the series with a passive-matrix LCD and had a 50 MHz 486SLC2, while the latter featured Cyrix's 486DX at 33 MHz. Though technically clocked slower than the 500C, the 700 machines actually were more powerful, owing to the true 32-bit nature of that processor. Epson followed this up with the 766 series, the first laptop to offer Cyrix's 66-MHz 486DX2.

To round out the company's personal computer lineup, Epson announced in May 1994 the ActionPC and the ActionTower. The ActionPC was a line of pizza-box desktop computers, while the ActionTower was built into a tower case. Like the ActionNote, the ActionPC and the ActionTower made exclusive use of Cyrix processors. They marked Epson's return to the PC-compatible desktop market since 1990.

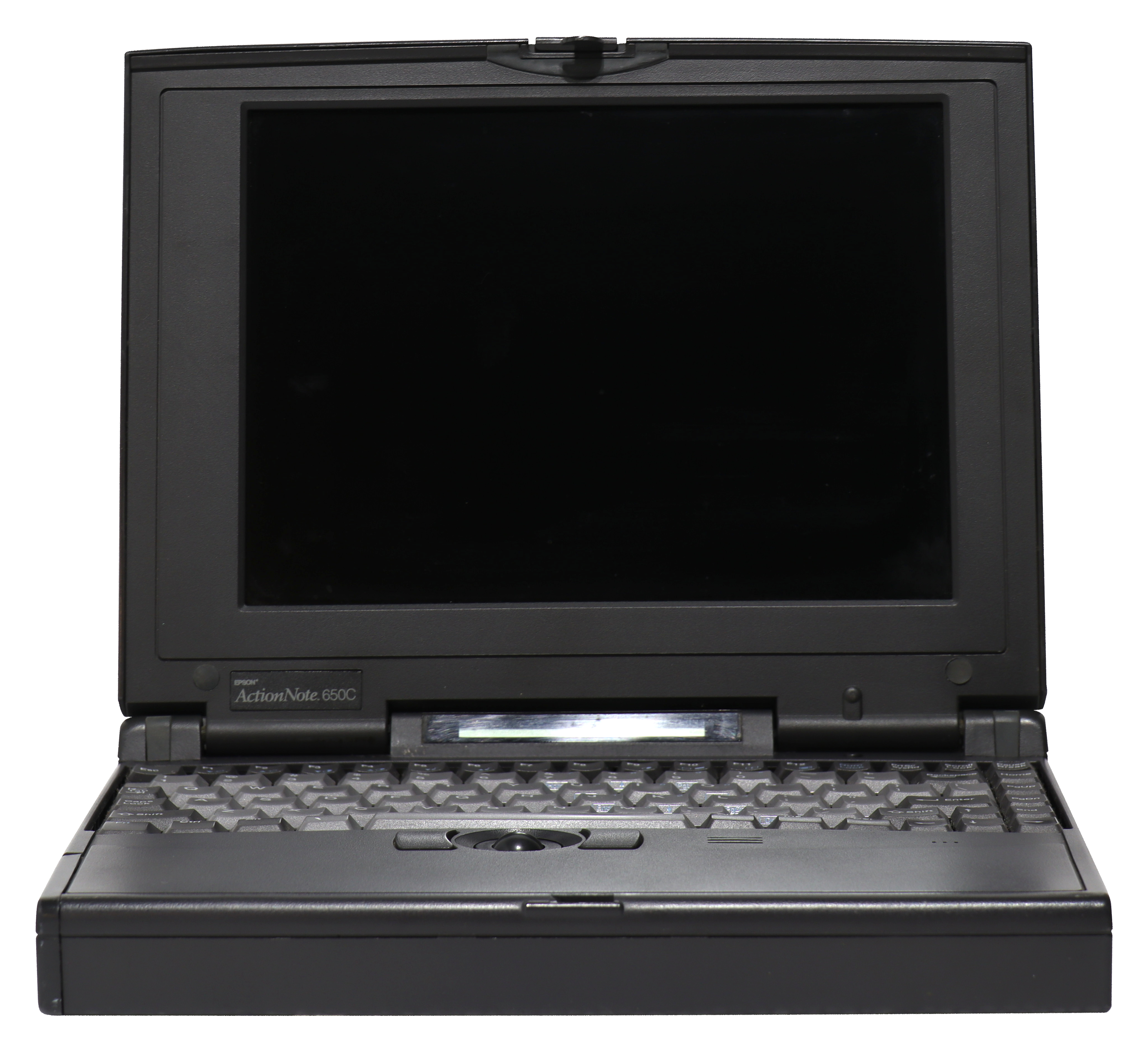
ActionNote 650C

The 650 series, marketed as a low-cost entry to the ActionNote line-up, sold between US$1,499 and US$1,999—depending on whether the user wanted a color LCD—and featured a clock-switchable 25 or 50 MHz Cyrix DX2. The more expensive 800 series upgraded the ActionNote's styling and was among the first Wintel laptops to feature an integrated touchpad, replacing the trackballs of earlier models. This trackpad was manufactured by Synaptics and was the first to incorporate capacitive sensing technology. The final entries in the 800 series featured 100 MHz Cyrix Cx486DX4 processors. The ActionNote series ended in January 1996 with the release of the 910C, which sported a 100 MHz 5x86, manufactured by ASE.

Manufacturing of the ActionNote was initially split between ASE Technologies of Taiwan and Epson's overseas plants in Singapore and Portland, Oregon, where the bulk of the company's personal computers were being manufactured. ASE Technologies, the laptop-manufacturing arm of Advanced Semiconductor Engineering, was founded two years earlier, in 1991. In October 1993, Epson shut down the PC production lines in their Singapore and Portland plants, repurposing them for the production of Epson's printers and scanners while simultaneously moving all PC production to Taiwan.

ASE was then the sole manufacturer of ActionNotes for the next few years, with the exception of the 650 and 660 series, which were produced by Compal, and the 700 series, for which Epson turned to Jabil Circuit of St. Petersburg, Florida. This was to be Jabil's break into the computer design industry; the company up to that point had only manufactured motherboards and components. Their contract with Epson fell through 5,000 units in, when Epson sued Jabil, stating that Jabil delivered the laptops 10 months late and out of Epson's specifications for the series. In addition, Epson said that the laptops developed stress fractures in the plastic casings after minimal use due to a processing flaw on the part of Jabil. Epson claimed $50 million in lost sales. Jabil sued their plastics supplier and countersued Epson, citing $6.5 million in unpaid shipments. The problem with the casings was later determined to be caused by lubricant in the hinges leaching into the plastics and compromising their integrity.

Epson America found the American computer market increasingly competitive going into the mid-1990s. The company announced in mid-1996 that it had left the international personal computer market, abandoning the ActionNote line (as well as the ActionTower and the ActionPC) in the process.

== Reception ==
Tom Benford of Compute! called the 4SLC-25 stylish and lightweight and praised the feel of the light touch and short travel of the keyboard. He concluded that its processing power and low cost meant that the ActionNote was a "way to get 486 processing muscle without breaking the bank". Catherine Kunkemueller of PC Magazine found the 4SLC-25's performance lacking on the other hand. Accounting Technology praised the follow-up 4SLC-33 for its performance; like Benford, the editors also praised the keyboard.

The ActionNote 4000 received mostly positive reviews. Bryan Hastings of PC World called its display small but "quite readable" and its keyboard comfortable but found the 2.5-hour battery life "on the short side" for a subnotebook. ABA Journal wrote that it offered "outstanding power", delivering high-end features typical of a desktop. Jean Marchant of Compute! found it a fast performer compared to other subnotebooks on the market at the time and praised the contrast of the LCD but found reservation with the keyboard layout. Albert G. Holzinger and Ripley Hotch of Nation's Business called it "not quite as technologically refined" as the ThinkPad 500 but found the 4000's display and keyboard similarly high quality. In a comparison with the ThinkPad 500, Byte writer Dave Rowell found that the ThinkPad "clearly comes out ahead" with respect to fit-and-finish, keyboard layout, choice of pointing device and performance. In specific, Rowell found the built-in trackball of the ActionNote 4000 irritating, its display brightness and contrast controls jerky and the typing experience error-prone due to the shortening of the right Shift key and its placement next to the arrow keys, though he found the keyboard switches smoother than the ThinkPad. Rowell praised the ease of removal of the hard drive allowing for shared use of the ActionNote and its "sharp, paper-white" display. InfoWorld liked the 4000's display and keyboard but found its single-hinged design made the screen wobbly.

The 800 series received mixed, mostly positive, reviews. The 866C possessed a large color screen for its small size and "everything the busy salesperson would need on board" but was let down by its "somewhat clackety-noisy" and shallow-stroke keyboard, according to Jeff Hecox of Sales and Marketing Management. In a review of the 880CX, Anush Yegyazarian of PC Magazine deemed it a good as a road warrior's machine but only fair as a desktop replacement. Despite the stock 8 MB of RAM leading to below-average scores in the magazine's benchmarks, Yegyazarian wrote that it offered a "an impressive array of features" for its retail price. Reviewing of the 880C, Dwight Silverman of the Houston Chronicle found the included hard drive slow, hindering the relatively fast 486DX2 processor and making for slow paging with the stock 8 MB of RAM. He also criticized the use of plastic port doors, finding that they jammed and flexed and were liable to break. He called the execution of its touchpad flawed in contrast to the one on the PowerBook 500, with its left and right click buttons too small and the act of dragging and dropping items on the screen cumbersome. Home Office Computing preferred the ActionNote's trackpad to the PowerBook's, on the other hand.

== Models ==
| Model no. | Processor | Clock speed (MHz) | Max. memory | LCD technology | LCD size and resolution | Date |
|---|---|---|---|---|---|---|
| 4SLC-25 | 486SLC | 25 | 8 | Monochrome passive | 10 in, VGA | April 1993 |
| 4000 | 486SLC | 33 | 8 | Monochrome passive | 7.5 in, VGA | June 1993 |
| 4SLC-33 | 486SLC | 33 | 8 | Monochrome passive | 10 in, VGA | August 1993 |
| 4SLC2-50 | 486SLC2 | 50 | 8 | Monochrome passive | 10 in, VGA | January 1994 |
| 500C | 486SLC2 | 50 | 8 | Color passive | 8.4 in, VGA | February 1994 |
| 700 | 486DX | 33 | 16 | Monochrome passive | 9.5 in, VGA | February 1994 |
| 700C | 486DX | 33 | 16 | Color passive | 9.5 in, VGA | February 1994 |
| 700CX | 486DX | 33 | 16 | Color active | 8.5 in, VGA | February 1994 |
| 766 | 486DX | 66 | 20 | Monochrome passive | 9.5 in, VGA | September 1994 |
| 766C | 486DX | 66 | 20 | Color passive | 9.5 in, VGA | September 1994 |
| 766CX | 486DX | 66 | 20 | Color active | 8.5 in, VGA | September 1994 |
| 650 | 486DX2 | 66 | 20 | Monochrome passive | 9.4 in, VGA | October 1994 |
| 650C | 486DX2 | 66 | 20 | Color passive | 10.3 in, VGA | October 1994 |
| 866C | 486DX2 | 66 | 24 | Color passive | 10.3 in, VGA | January 1995 |
| 880C | 486DX2 | 66 | 24 | Color passive | 10.3 in, VGA | February 1995 |
| 880CX | 486DX2 | 66 | 24 | Color active | 10.4 in, VGA | April 1995 |
| 660C | 486DX2 | 66 | 24 | Color passive | 10.3 in, VGA | August 1995 |
| 660CX | 486DX2 | 66 | 24 | Color active | 9.5 in, VGA | August 1995 |
| 890 | 486DX4 | 100 | 24 | Monochrome passive | 9.5 in, VGA | October 1995 |
| 890C | 486DX4 | 100 | 24 | Color passive | 10.4 in, VGA | October 1995 |
| 890CX | 486DX4 | 100 | 24 | Color active | 10.4 in, VGA | October 1995 |
| 895C | 486DX4 | 100 | 24 | Color passive | 10.4 in, VGA | October 1995 |
| 895CX | 486DX4 | 100 | 24 | Color active | 10.4 in, VGA | October 1995 |
| 910C | 5x86 | 100 | 24 | Color passive | 10.4 in, VGA | January 1996 |
