= UMC Green CPU =

X86 microprocessor

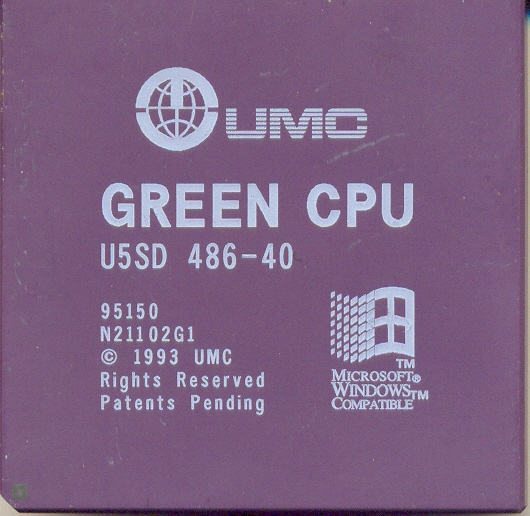
- A UMC U5SD microprocessor rated for 40 MHz motherboards.

General information
- Launched: ca. 1990s
- Common manufacturer: UMC

Performance
- Max. CPU clock rate: 25 MHz to 40 MHz
- Data width: 32 bits
- Address width: 32 bits
- Virtual address width: 32 bits (linear); 46 bits (logical)

Physical specifications
- Package: PGA (socket 1, 2, 3), 196-pin PQFP, 208-pin SQFP

Architecture and classification
- Technology node: 0.6 μm to 0.35 μm
- Instruction set: x86-16, IA-32 including x87 (except for U5SD)

The UMC Green CPU was an x86-compatible microprocessor produced by UMC, a Taiwanese semiconductor company, in the early- to mid-1990s. It was offered as an alternative to the Intel 80486 with which it was pin compatible, enabling it to be installed in most 80486 motherboards. All models had power management features intended to reduce electricity consumption.

== Models produced ==
The UMC Green CPU was available with different features, physical characteristics and clock speeds. Some of which were only sold in limited quantities.

=== Available models ===
All models feature an 8 KB level 1 cache and operate at clock speeds of 25 MHz, 33 MHz, or 40 MHz.

Model	FPU	Package	Voltage	Notes
U5S	No	CPGA	5.0 V	Compatible with the 486SX.
U5D	No	CPGA	5.0 V	Compatible with the 486DX, very few were produced.
U5SX	No	CPGA, PPGA, PQFP	5.0 V	Identical to the U5S, the QFP version was available as an embedded solution or attached to a PGA adapter.
U5SD	No	CPGA	5.0 V	Few were produced. Functionally identical to U5S and U5SX but with 486DX pinout.
U5SF	No	PQFP	5.0 V	Plastic Package, an embedded solution for smaller computers.
U5SLV	No	PQFP	3.3 V	Low-voltage version
U5FLV	No	PQFP	3.3 V	Low-voltage version, often embedded on the motherboard.

Functionally all models except U5D are identical and only differed in their intended application, voltage rating or physical packaging. The U5SD does not contain a floating point unit and is indistinguishable from other U5S chips in operation, though it is unusual because it features a 486DX pinout as opposed to the more common 486SX pinout versions. This would allow installation into certain older motherboards which may have had upgrade sockets hardwired to fit only 486DX chips.

=== Production and fabrication ===
As one of the largest chip foundry owners in Taiwan, UMC owns several fabrication plants which allowed them to fabricate their own designs, whereas some other manufacturers, notably Cyrix, had to contract this process out to third parties such as IBM and Texas Instruments. All available models of Green CPU were produced on a 0.6 μm CMOS process. The chips were available in both plastic and ceramic packages for different applications. The majority of PQFP variants were sold to motherboard manufacturers as a low-cost embedded solution.

== Performance ==
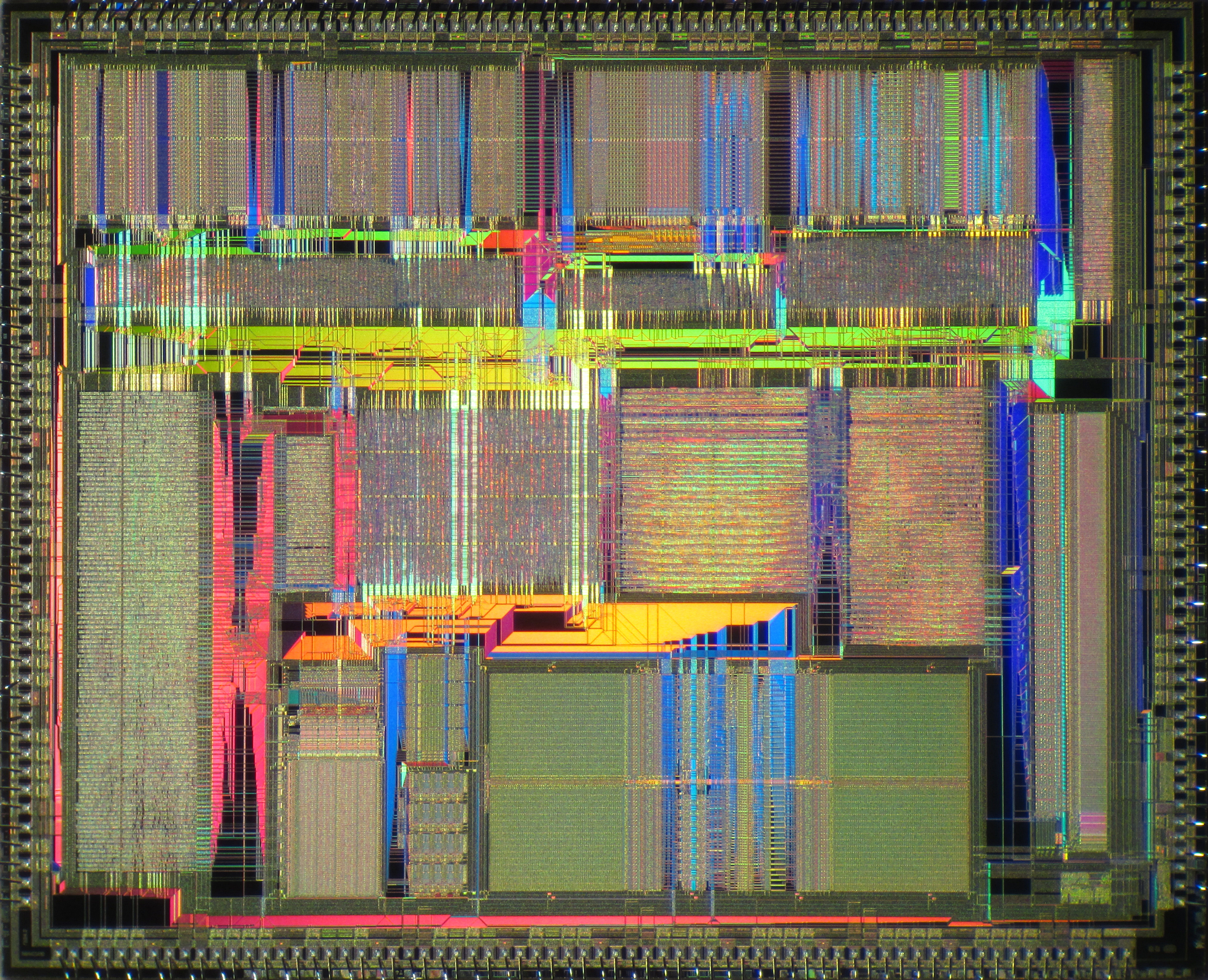
Die shot of a UMC U5S microprocessor

The UMC U5 Series design was focused on microcode optimizations. An equivalently clocked Intel or AMD processor required 40 cycles to perform an integer division whereas the UMC processors required only 7, allowing the instruction to complete significantly faster. Performance is generally observed to be higher than competing processors on a clock-for-clock basis; The 40 MHz U5S model being comparable to an AMD Am486SX2 at 66 MHz with correctly configured motherboards.

Due to an error in the microcode, Microsoft Windows 98 Second Edition identifies some processors as an Intel Pentium MMX which could cause the operating system and software running within it to crash or exhibit undefined behavior.

== Clock doubling version ==
UMC produced a small quantity of clock doubling processors labeled as the U486DX2. These processors were designed to compete with other clock doubling solutions such as the Intel 80486DX2, AMD Am486DX2 and Cyrix Cx486DX2, but due to ongoing legal troubles UMC withdrew the U486DX2 from production. The processor was only ever produced as an engineering sample and never made it to market, it was manufactured with a 0.35 μm CMOS process and is contained within a ceramic package.

== Legal dispute ==
In 1994, Intel alleged that UMC had infringed upon its patent for the 80486 microprocessor and filed complaints against UMC and its distributors. UMC countered the claims with an anti-trust suit and the case was eventually settled out of court with UMC withdrawing their product and ceasing production of 80486-compatible microprocessors.

As a result of the dispute, all processors were prohibited from sale within the United States and were visibly labelled as such. Placement of this label varies, the ceramic U5S and U5D models typically display "Not for U.S. sale or import" as part of the silkscreen on the top of the chip where the U5SX and U5SD models usually had "NOT FOR U.S. SALE" printed onto the golden die cover on the underside of the package. This labelling is often absent from plastic packages.

== Gallery ==
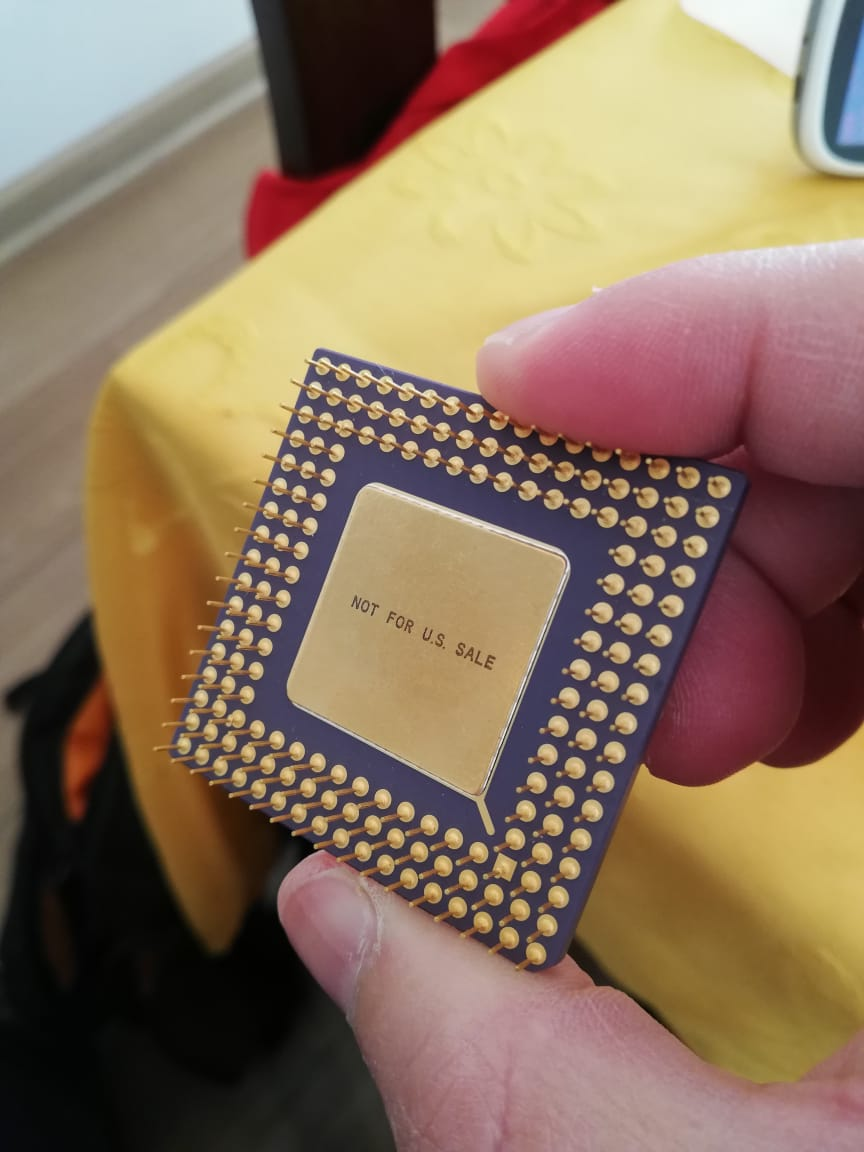
A UMC Green CPU. Label "Not for U.S. sale" is printed backside. Model U5SD, 486, 33Mhz.

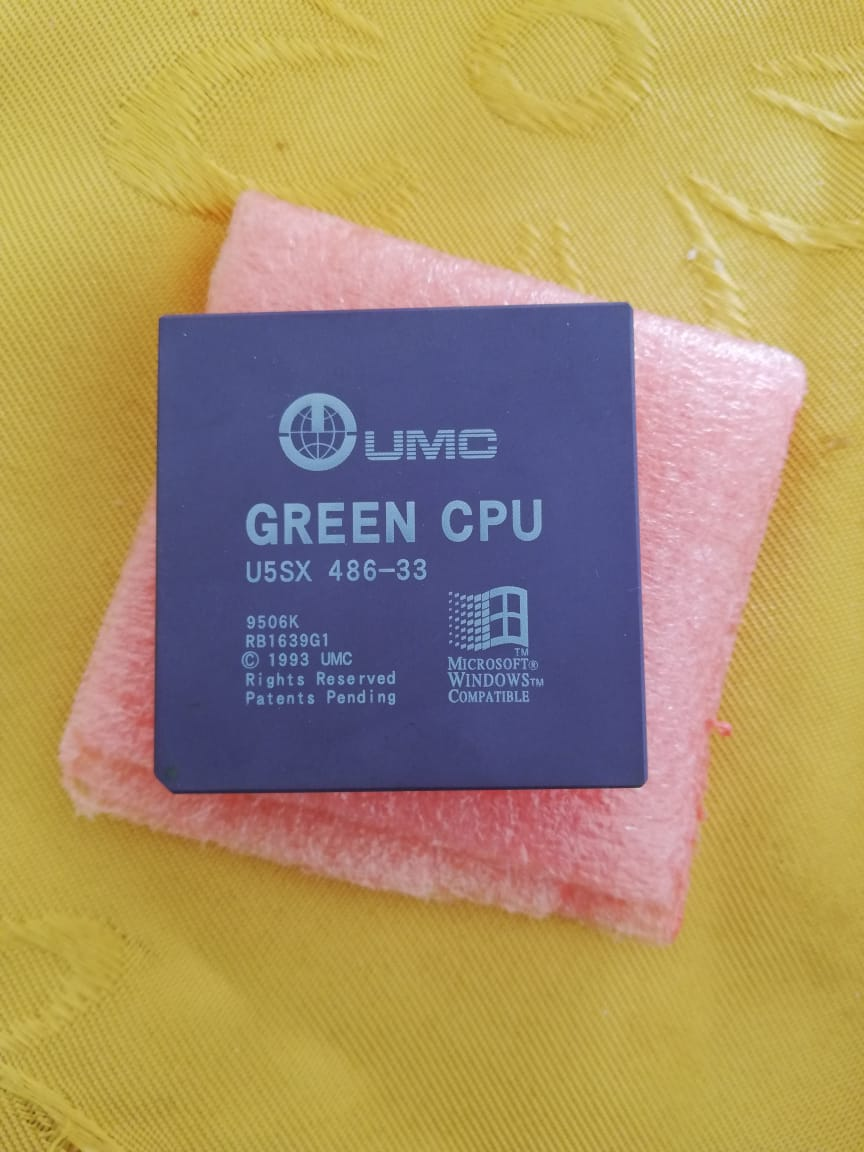
A UMC Green CPU, U5SD 486 33Mhz. 1993. Note the Microsoft Windows compatible logo, corresponding to Windows prior to Windows 95 (Windows 3.11 as year 1993 printed on top).

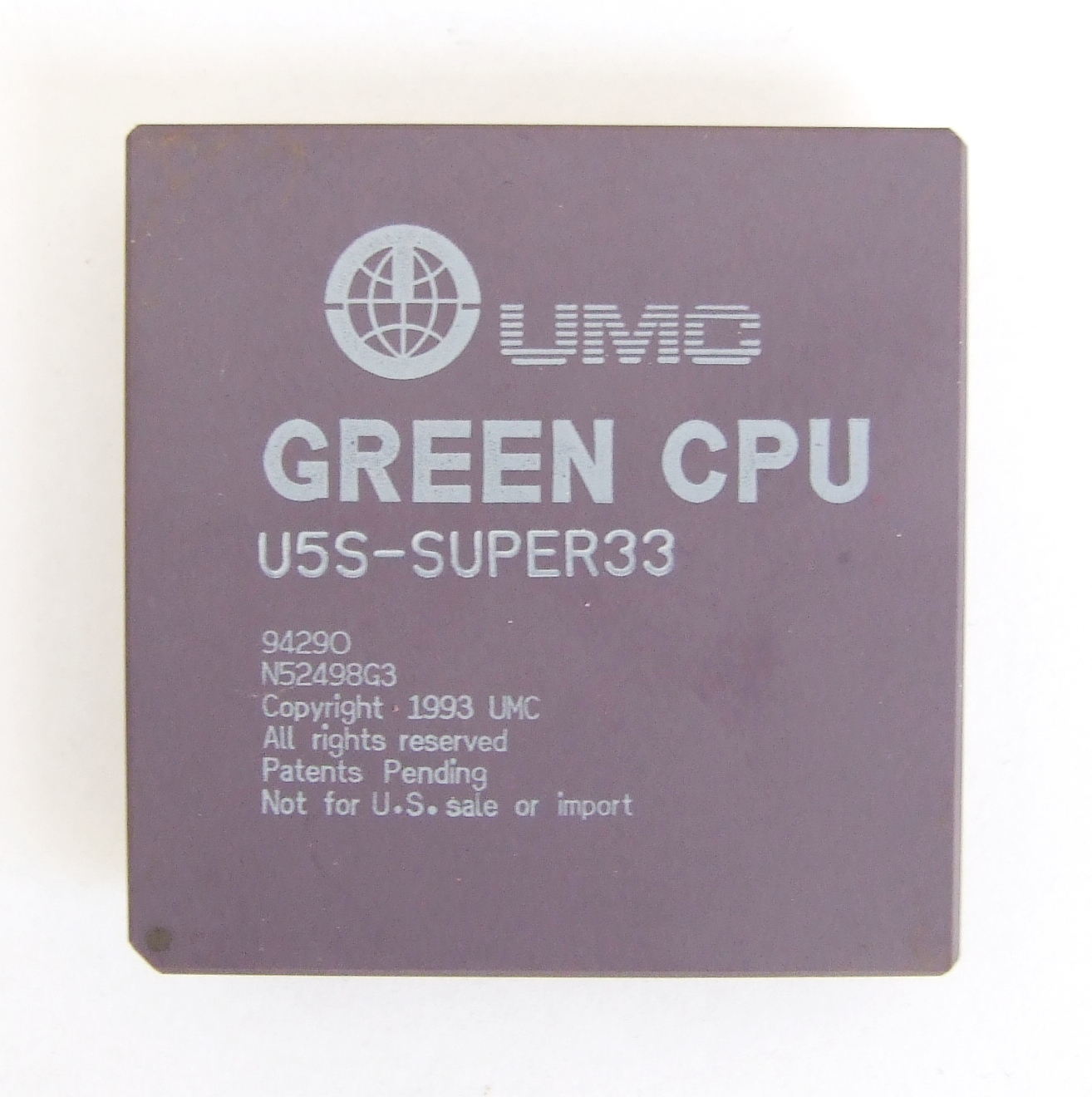
A UMC U5S rated for 33 MHz with "Not for U.S. sale or import" on its silkscreen
