= Cyrix Cx486 =

486-compatible microprocessor by Cyrix

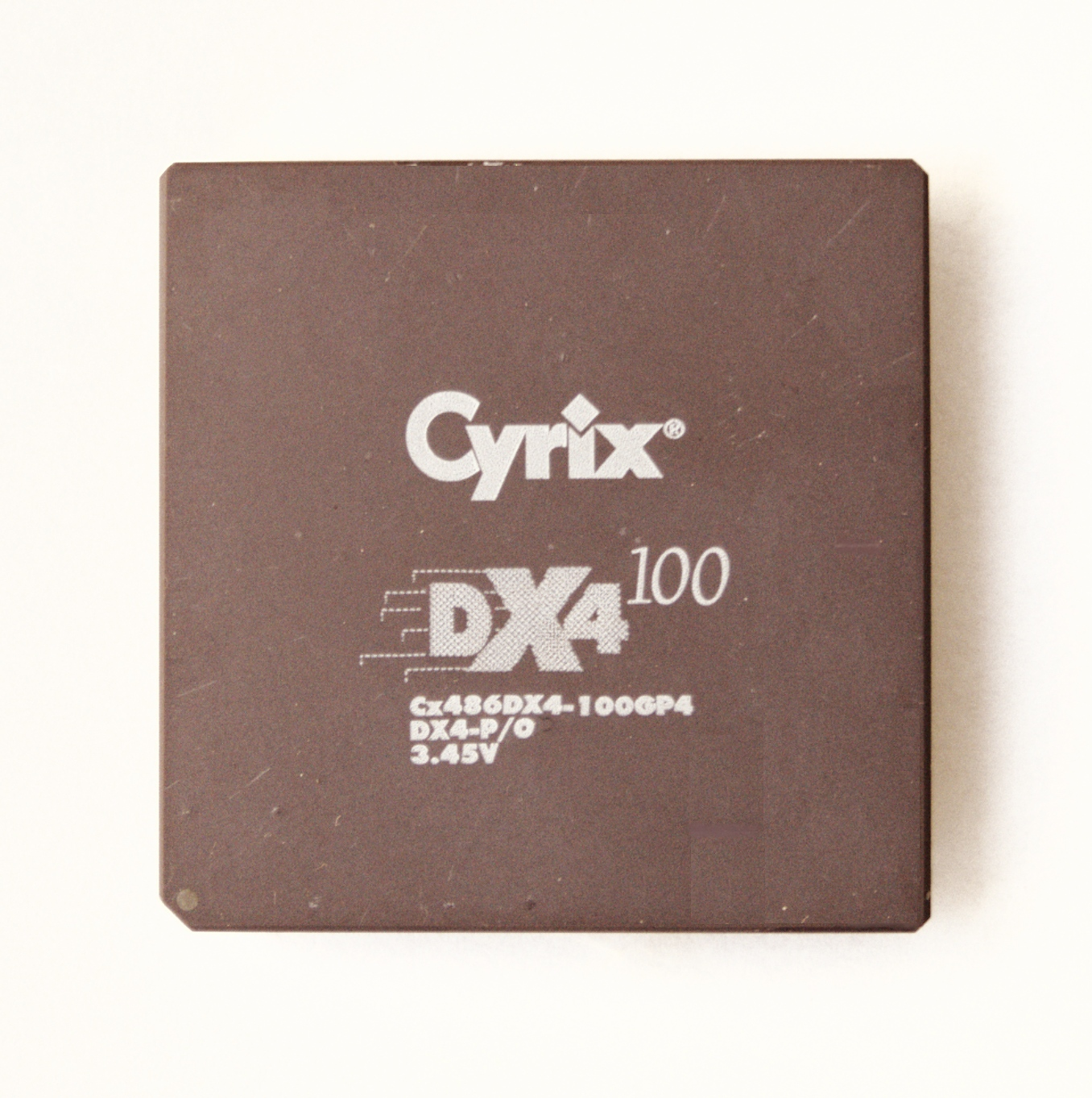
- A Cyrix Cx486DX4 microprocessor rated for 100MHz operation

General information
- Launched: May 1993
- Common manufacturer: Cyrix

Performance
- Max. CPU clock rate: 25 MHz to 100 MHz
- FSB speeds: 25 MHz to 33 MHz

Cache
- L1 cache: 2 KB (S); 8 KB (DX/DX2/DX4)

Architecture and classification
- Application: Desktop
- Instruction set: x86-16, IA-32

Physical specifications
- Cores: 1

History
- Predecessors: Cyrix Cx486SLC, Cyrix Cx486DLC
- Successors: Cyrix 5x86, Cyrix 6x86

The Cyrix Cx486 was an x86 microprocessor designed by Cyrix. It primarily competed with the Intel 486 with which it was software compatible, would operate in the same motherboards provided proper support by the BIOS was available and generally showed comparable performance. The chip also competed with parts from AMD and UMC.

== Production ==
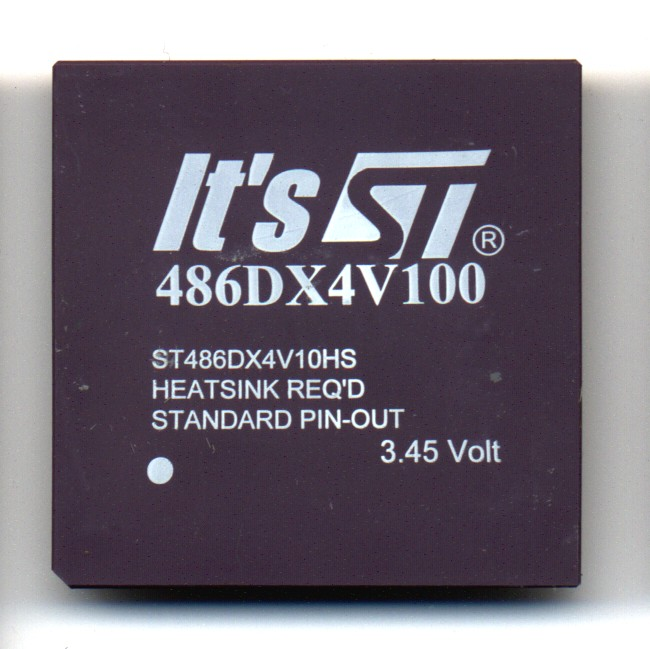
A Cyrix-designed SGS-Thomson processor. SGS sold Cyrix processors under their own label as per their contract.

Due to Cyrix being a fabless company, Cyrix used Texas Instruments, SGS Thomson and IBM which had their own foundries to manufacture their processors, though this was done under a contract that allowed each company to build and sell Cyrix-designed processors under their own branding.

As a result, there were many versions of the Cx486 and the manufacture of them differed slightly depending on which company had built them, though equivalent chips generally perform near-identically enough that the end user would not notice any difference between them.

The contract with SGS-Thomson outlived the Cyrix Cx486 processor's lifespan in the mainstream market by over a decade with SGS-Thomson still producing industrial solutions built upon the Cyrix design into the late-2000s.

== Variants ==
The Cyrix Cx486 was available with different features, clock speeds and voltages over the duration of its production.

=== Cx486S ===
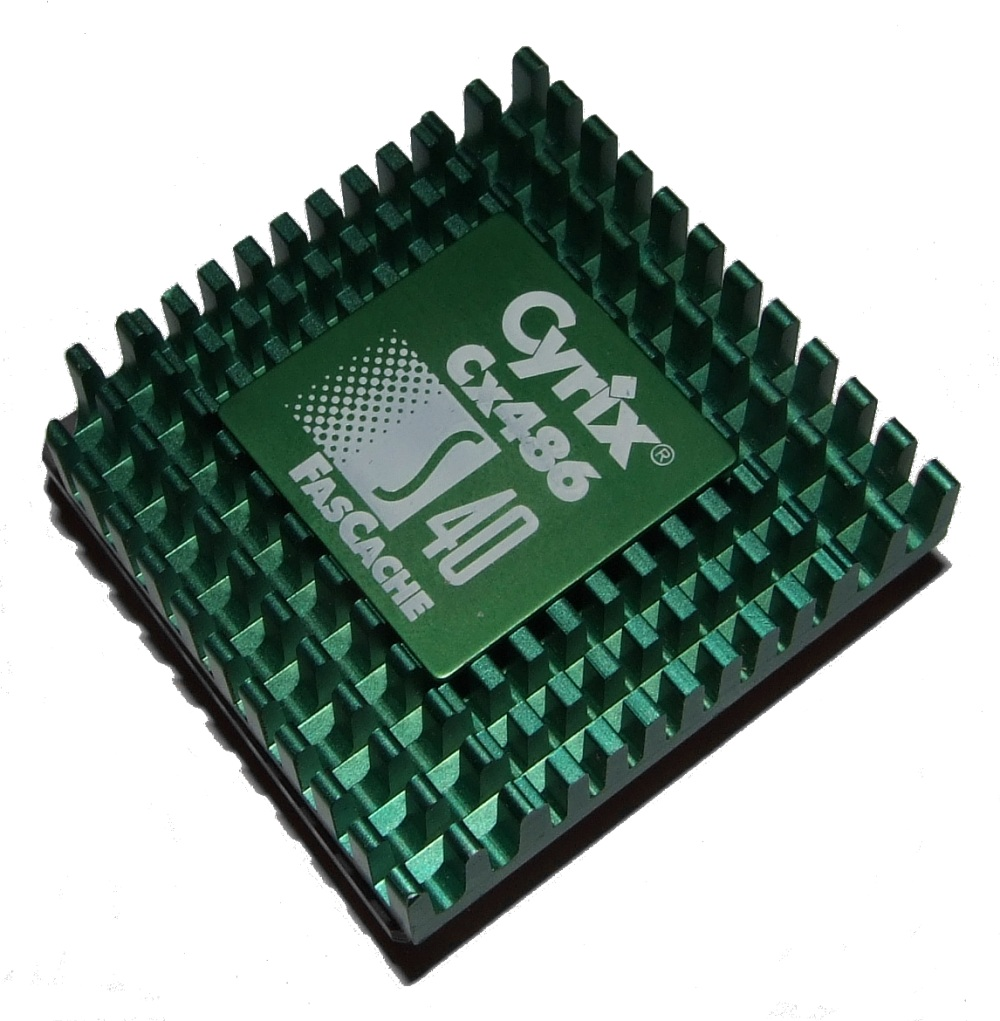
A Cyrix Cx486S processor. Compatible with the Intel 486SX.

Introduced in May 1993, the Cyrix Cx486S, codenamed M6, was designed to be compatible with the Intel 486SX and like the Intel part, did not have a floating point unit onboard which was of little concern to an average user at the time due to most games and applications using purely integer-based code. The processor did, however, sport a 2KB Write-back cache and a special "Write-Burst" signal which offered a slight performance boost in certain applications provided the motherboard was capable of utilizing the feature. The processors were labelled "FasCache" to emphasize this feature as most processors used slower write-through caches.

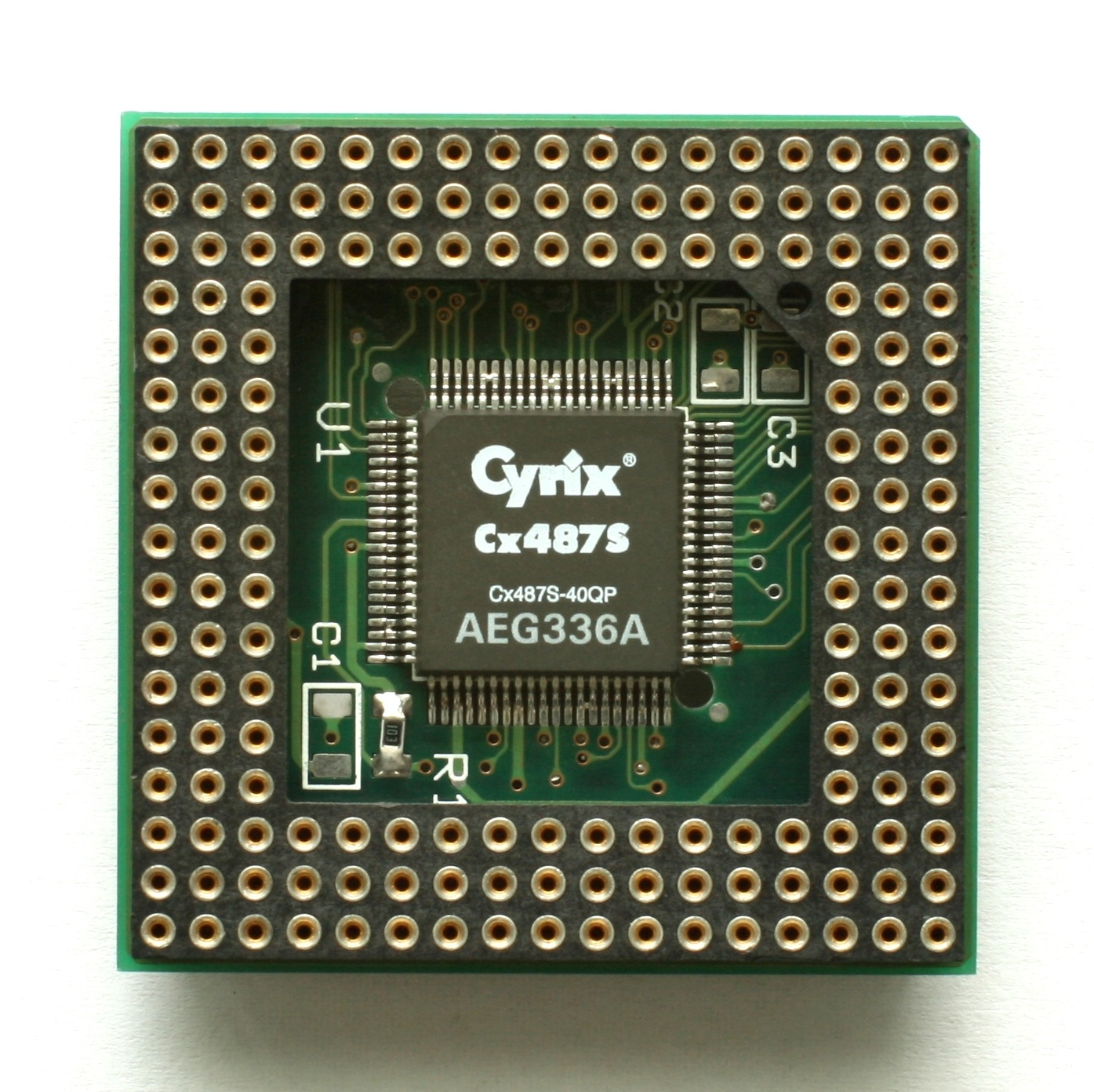
The Cyrix Cx487S FPU coprocessor, installed between CPU and motherboard socket.

Users could upgrade the processor to 486DX specifications through use of an accessory, the Cyrix Cx487S which was an x87 Floating Point Unit coprocessor which fit between the CPU and the socket on the motherboard.

The table below lists the models of this CPU that were produced.

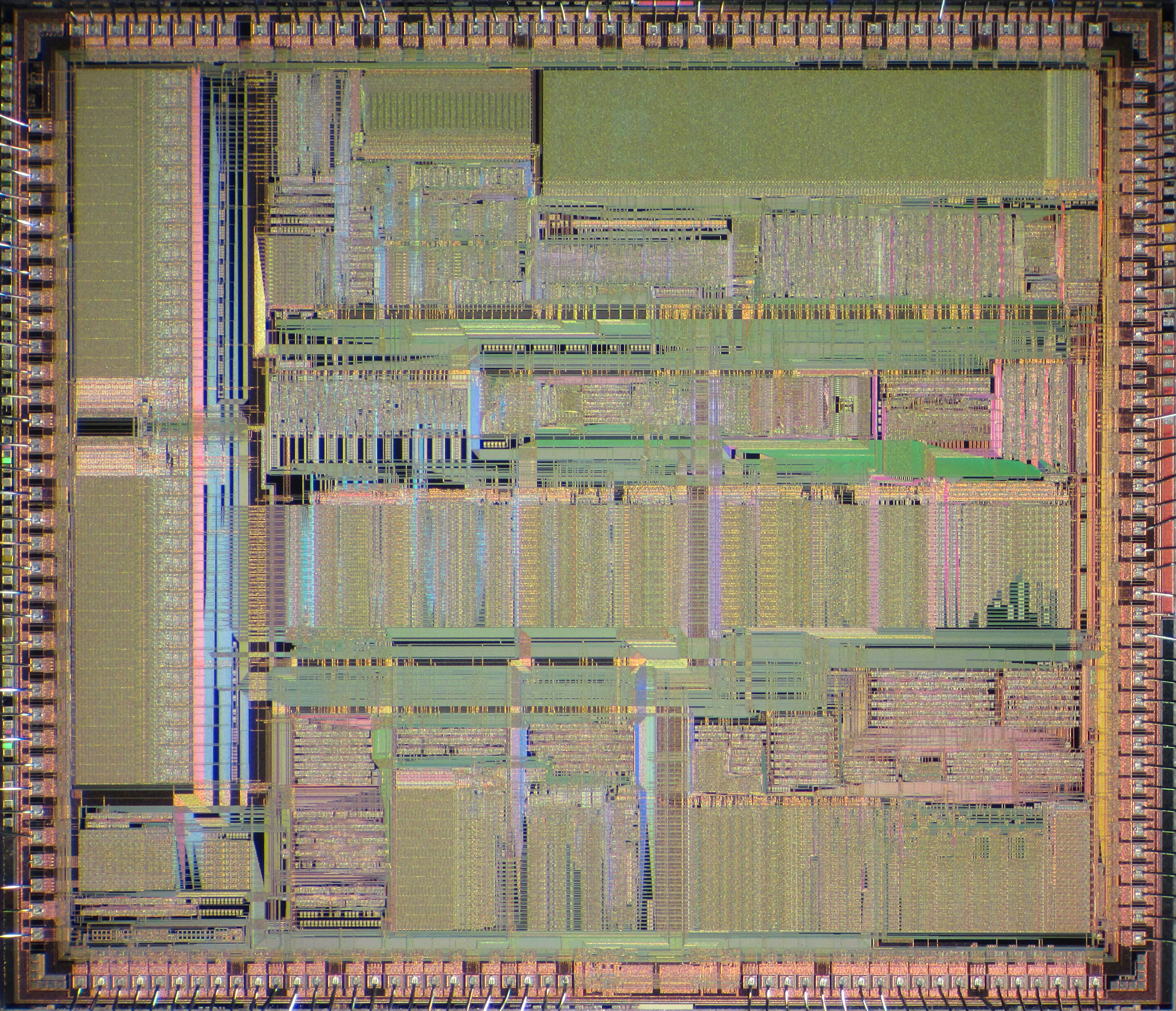
Die shot of Cx486S-33.

Models of Cx486S
Model/Feature	Bus Speed	Clock Frequency	Cache	Voltage	Notes
Cx486S-25	25 MHz	25 MHz	2KB	5 Volts DC	Does not have a heatsink.
Cx486S-33	33 MHz	33 MHz	2KB	5 Volts DC	Available with permanently attached heatsink.
Cx486S-40	40 MHz	40 MHz	2KB	5 Volts DC	Available with permanently attached heatsink.

The Cyrix Cx486DLC is a derivative of this processor and was used to upgrade computers on the 80386 platform.

=== Cx486DX ===
Codenamed M7, the Cyrix Cx486DX is essentially the same as the Cx486S except it featured an internal Floating Point Unit and quadruple the amount of cache memory. It was available in a form that allowed lower voltage operation. The processor was found to have comparable performance to competing solutions, but it varied depending on the application.

The table below lists models of this CPU that were produced.

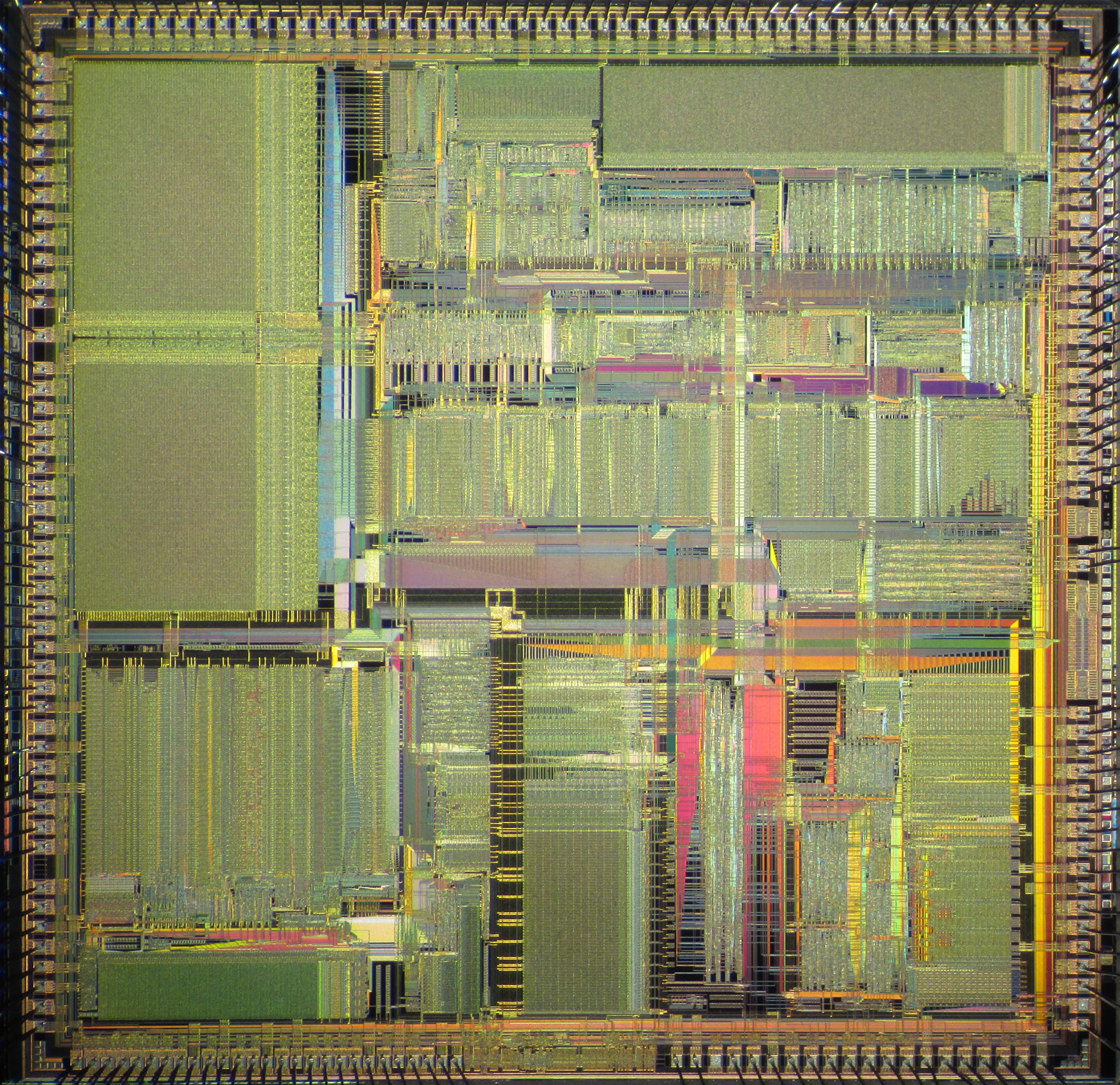
Die shot of Cx486DX-40.

Models of Cx486DX
Model/Feature	Bus Speed	Clock Frequency	Cache	Voltage	Notes
Cx486DX-33	33 MHz	33 MHz	8KB	5 Volts DC	Does not have a heatsink.
Cx486DX-33QP	33 MHz	33 MHz	8KB	3.3 Volts DC	QFP Package, Low Voltage. Does not have a heatsink.
Cx486DX-40	40 MHz	40 MHz	8KB	5 Volts DC	Available with permanently attached heatsink.
Cx486DX-50	50 MHz	50 MHz	8KB	5 Volts DC	Available with permanently attached heatsink. Uncommon.

Despite the faster clock speeds, the 50 MHz version of this processor was less popular than the other models Cyrix had produced. This is likely due to VESA Local Bus being common in computers around the time of the processors introduction as the bus was notoriously unreliable when operating at speeds of over 33 MHz. Many peripherals and even the bus itself will exhibit undefined behaviors at higher speeds on a large number of motherboards. This is reflected by Intel and AMD processors operating at 50 MHz where their sales show a similar trait of being less popular. Users could potentially negate this by increasing latency for the memory, cache and bus but this would also cause performance to drop.

=== Cx486DX2 ===
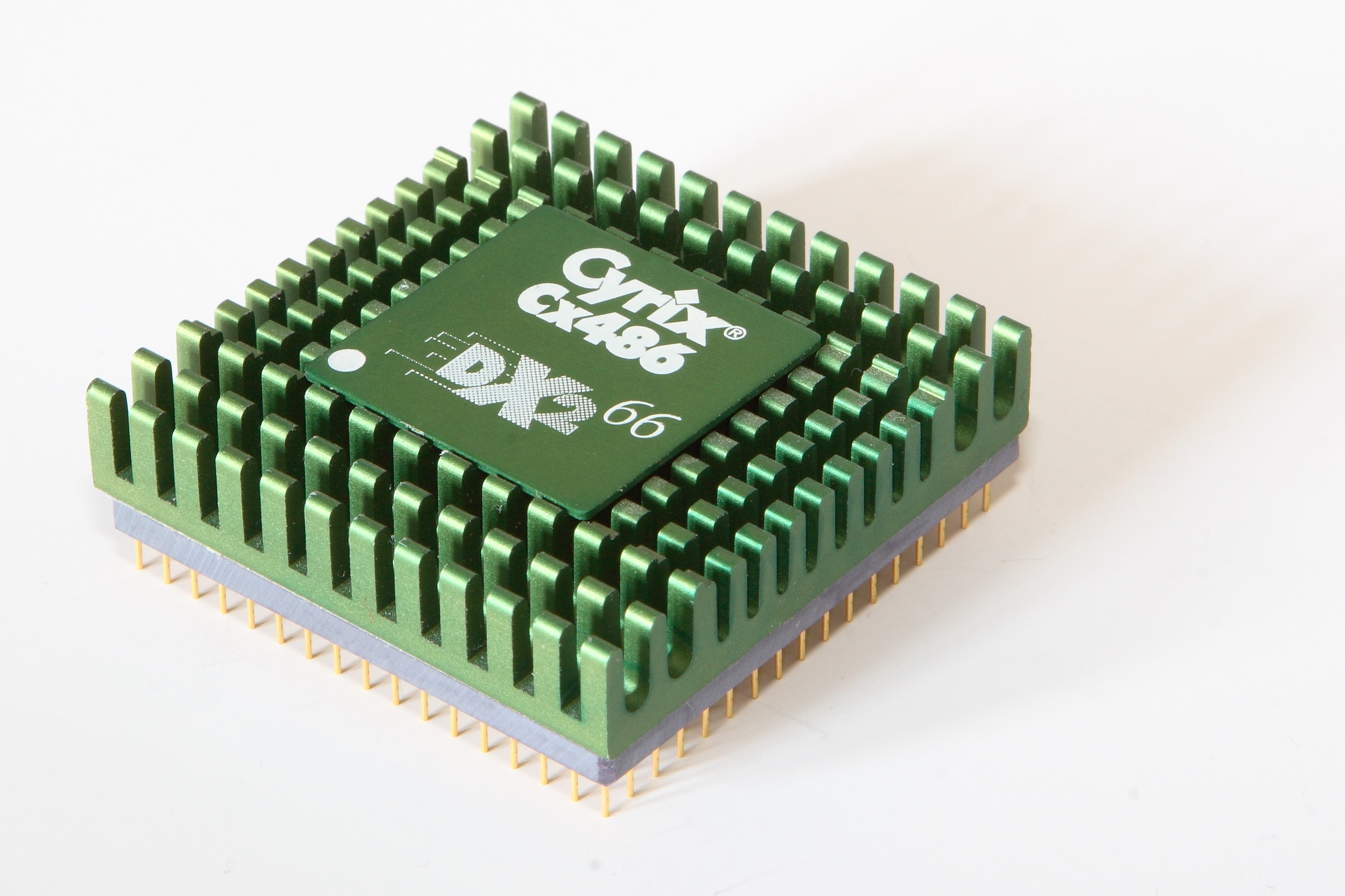
Cyrix Cx486DX2 rated for 66MHz operation.

Introduced in September 1993 alongside the single clock version was a clock doubling version of the Cx486DX. It was intended to compete with the Intel 80486DX2 and had similar capabilities. Its lower price point than equivalent Intel processors made it a popular choice.

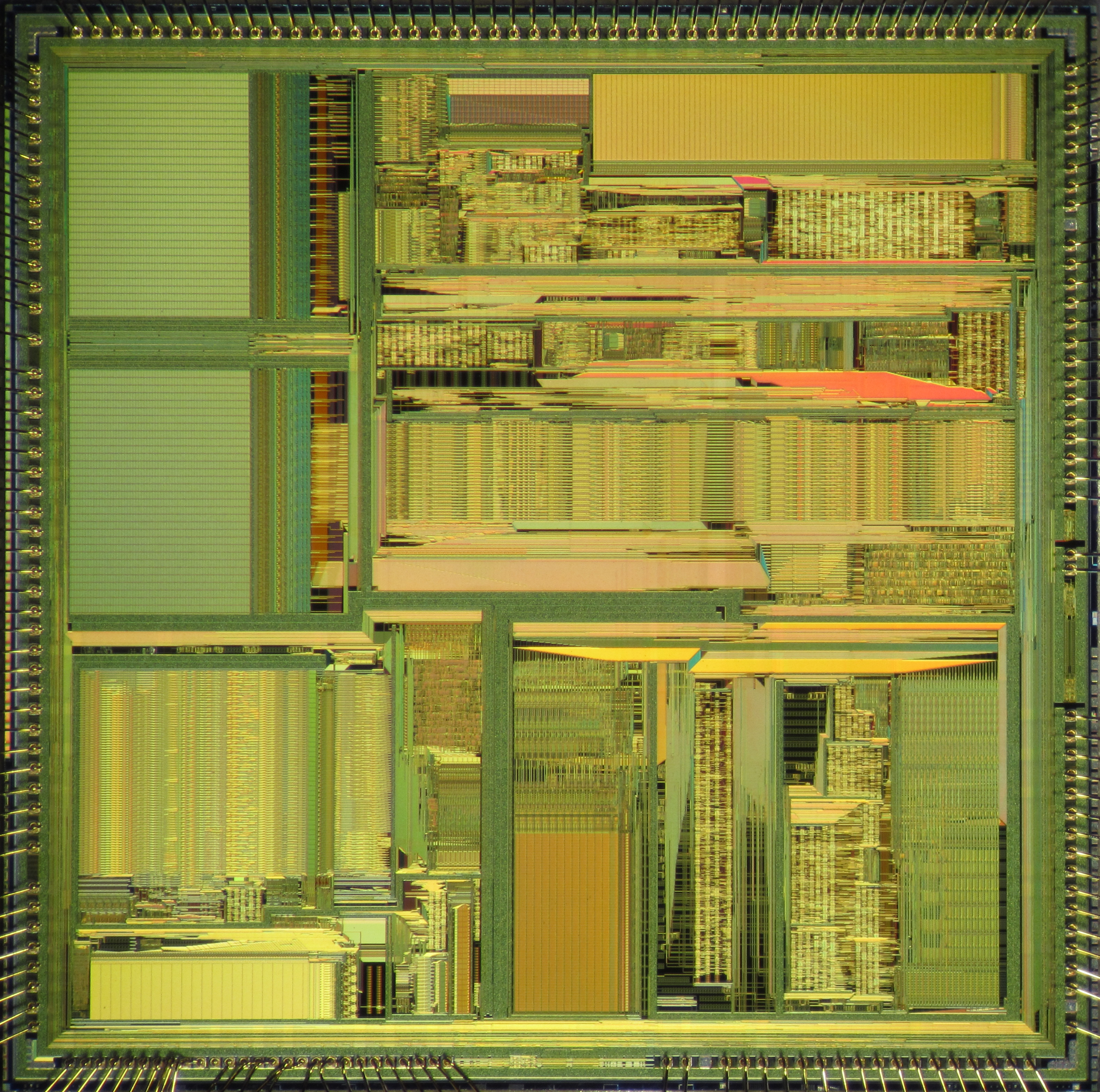
Die shot of Cx486DX2-V66.

Models of Cx486DX2
Model/Feature	Bus Speed	Clock Frequency	Cache	Voltage	Notes
Cx486DX2-50	25 MHz	50 MHz	8KB	5 Volts DC	Available with permanently attached heatsink.
Cx486DX2-66	33 MHz	66 MHz	8KB	5 Volts DC	Available with permanently attached heatsink.
Cx486DX2-V66	33 MHz	66 MHz	8KB	3.3 or 3.45 Volts DC	Low Voltage. Available with permanently attached heatsink.
Cx486DX2-V66 PQFP	33 MHz	66 MHz	8KB	3.3 Volts DC	Available with permanently attached heatsink, Low Voltage. QFP Package.
Cx486DX2-80	40 MHz	80 MHz	8KB	5 Volts DC	Available with permanently attached heatsink.
Cx486DX2-V80	40 MHz	80 MHz	8KB	3.45 or 4.0 Volts DC	Low Voltage. Available with permanently attached heatsink.

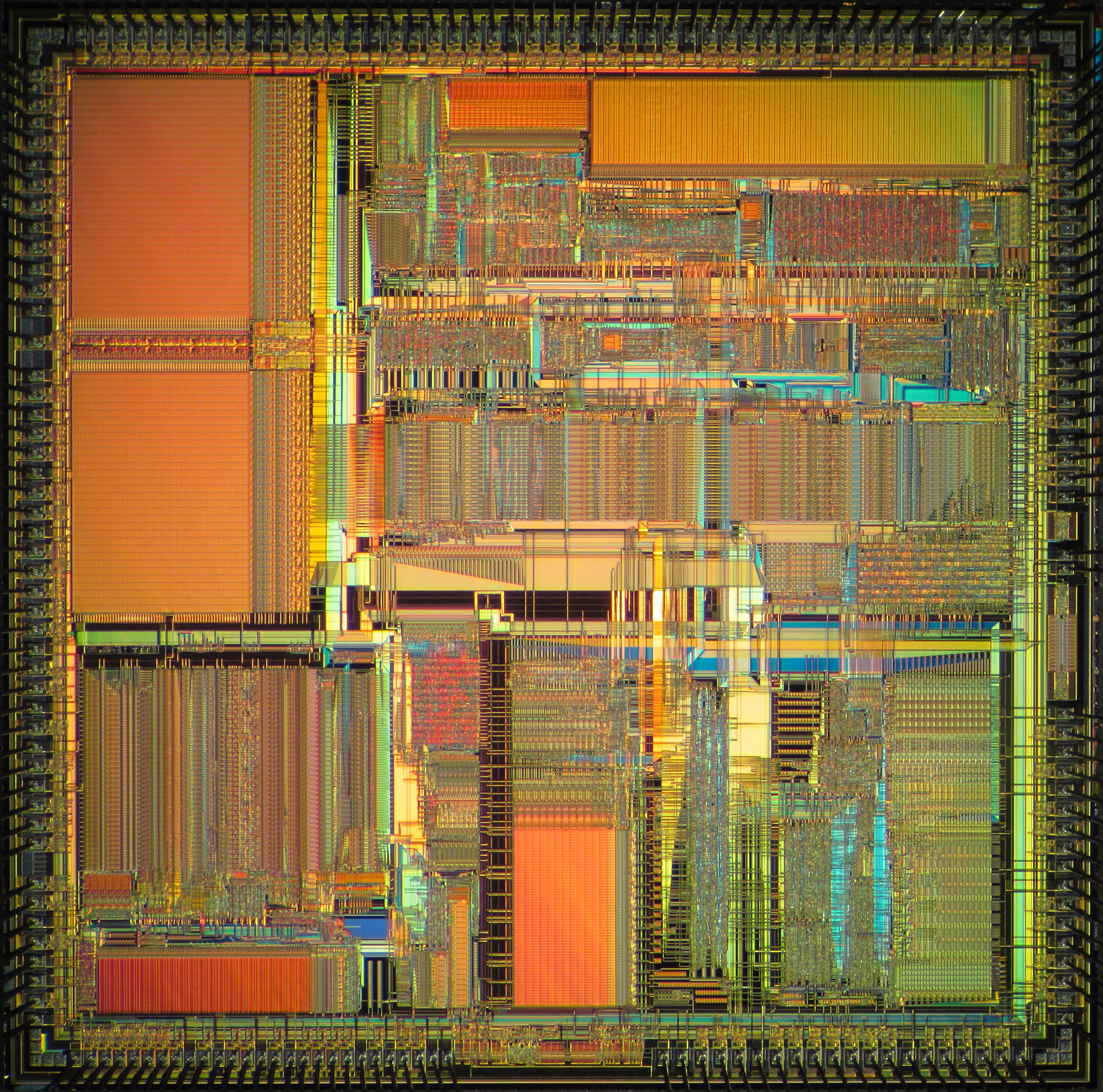
Die shot of Texas Instruments TI486DX2-G66.

The 50 MHz version is again the least common, this time likely due to the slower bus speed rendering any upgrade questionable as the performance gains would be reduced by the lower bus speed.

The 80 MHz version was introduced in November 1994.

=== Cx486DX4 ===
The final version of the Cx486 to bear the Cyrix name was a Clock Tripling CPU which was only available with a 100 MHz Internal Clock. Introduced in September 1995, it was otherwise not vastly different to the older designs and proved to be competitive both performance-wise and price-wise against offerings from AMD and Intel though it was later to market than its competitors.

== Legal dispute ==
In 1993, Intel alleged that Cyrix had infringed several patents and initiated legal action. The courts found that Cyrix had indeed reverse engineered the Intel part, but had conceived their own compatible design, the courts also found that Texas Instruments, SGS-Thomson and IBM were licensed to produce Intel designs. Eventually the case was dropped and Intel paid Cyrix $12 million to drop anti-trust charges against them.

The legal battle delayed several of Cyrix's products, causing them to arrive later than competing solutions.

== Embedded solutions ==
The Cyrix Cx486DX2 design was used by STMicroelectronics in 1999 for their STPC SoC range. This was essentially a Cyrix Cx486, chipset, graphics and most I/O integrated into a single chip. The CPU performs identically to a Cyrix part at the same clock speed. The STPC was produced until 2008 and was found in a variety of systems, usually small embedded systems for industrial use or Single-board computer devices, such as those using the PC/104 form factor. One notable difference between the STPC and other Cx486 processors is the Host Clock which operates at 66 MHz for STPC devices. As such, the 66 MHz model does not use clock doubling at all, but the 133 MHz version does. This differs from most competing systems, such as the AMD Élan processors based on AMD's Enhanced Am486 core as used in the Am5x86 which still relied upon a 33 MHz external clock.
