= HD-64180 =

HD-64180 may be:

- HD64180, the Hitachi variant of the Z80 central processing unit (CPU), and is an embedded microprocessor with built-in memory management unit (MMU).
- HD 64180, (CD -42°3592, SAO 219060), a star in the Henry Draper Catalogue. It is a white A-type star in the constellation Puppis and has an apparent magnitude of +9.34. It is located at 07h 50m 48.495s −42° 37′ 03.10″.
