= Z80 instruction set =

Microprocessor instruction set

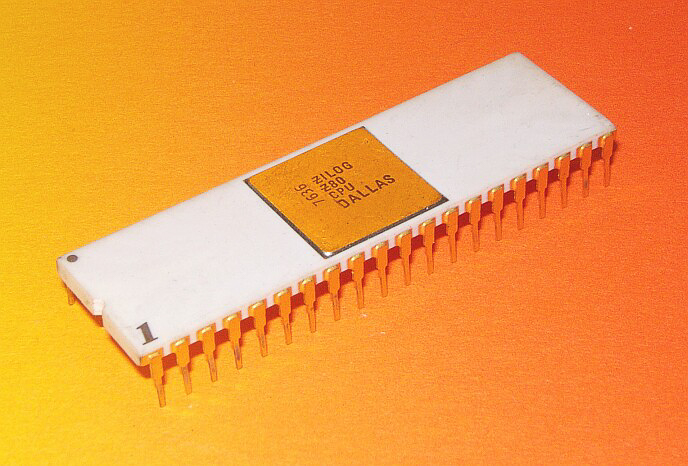
Zilog Z80 CPU. 1976 date code.

The Zilog Z80 is an 8-bit microprocessor introduced in 1976. The instruction set was designed to be upward binary compatible with the Intel 8080. Intel 8080 instructions are one to three bytes long whereas the Z80 requires up to four bytes per instruction.

Zilog continued to expand the instruction set of the Z80 with several successors including the Z180, Z280, and Z380. The latest iteration, the eZ80, was introduced in 2001 and was available for purchase as of 2025. The instruction set also appears on non-Zilog CPUs such as the Hitachi HD64180, Mitsui R800, and the Eastern Bloc U880.

== Instruction set ==
The Z80 uses 252 out of the available 256 codes as single byte opcodes (the "root instructions"), most of which are inherited from the 8080. The four remaining codes are used extensively as opcode prefixes: CB and ED enable extra instructions, and DD or FD select IX or IY respectively in place of HL. This scheme gives the Z80 a large number of permutations of instructions and registers. Zilog categorizes these into 158 different "instruction types", 78 of which are the same as those of the Intel 8080. This allows operation of all 8080 programs on a Z80. The Zilog documentation further groups instructions into categories. Most are from the 8080, others are entirely new like the block and bit instructions, and other 8080 instructions with more versatile addressing modes, like the 16-bit loads, I/O, rotates/shifts, and relative jumps. The categories are:

- Load and exchange
- Block transfer and search
- Arithmetic and logical
- Rotate and shift
- Bit manipulation (set, reset, test)
- Jump, call, and return
- Input/output
- CPU control

=== Encoding order ===
To expand on the 8080 instruction set, Z80 instructions may require a IX/IY override, an opcode prefix, or both. Any one instruction may contain up to four components. The components of the instruction are assembled in the following order:

IX/IY override
CB or ED prefix
(IX/IY + n) offset if CB
Opcode
(IX/IY + n) offset if no CB
data or address

=== Root instructions ===
The root opcodes include all the 8080 opcodes. The Z80 adds eight new one-byte instructions, two opcode prefixes, and the IX and IY overrides. Colored rows indicate new Z80 instructions.

Opcode								Operands		Mnemonic	Description
7	6	5	4	3	2	1	0	b2	b3	Mnemonic	Description
0	0	0	0	0	0	0	0	—	—	NOP	No operation
0	0	RP		0	0	0	1	datlo	dathi	LD rp,data	RP ← data
0	0	RP		0	0	1	0	—	—	LD (rp),A	(RP) ← A [BC or DE only]
0	0	RP		0	0	1	1	—	—	INC rp	RP ← RP + 1
0	0	DDD			1	0	0	—	—	INC ddd	DDD ← DDD + 1
0	0	DDD			1	0	1	—	—	DEC ddd	DDD ← DDD - 1
0	0	DDD			1	1	0	data	—	LD ddd,data	DDD ← data
0	0	0	0	0	1	1	1	—	—	RLCA	A_{1-7} ← A_{0-6}; A_{0} ← Cy ← A_{7}
0	0	RP		1	0	0	1	—	—	ADD rp	HL ← HL + RP
0	0	RP		1	0	1	0	—	—	LD A,(rp)	A ← (RP) [BC or DE only]
0	0	RP		1	0	1	1	—	—	DEC rp	RP ← RP - 1
0	0	0	0	1	0	0	0	—	—	EX AF,AF'	AF ↔ AF′
0	0	0	0	1	1	1	1	—	—	RRCA	A_{0-6} ← A_{1-7}; A_{7} ← Cy ← A_{0}
0	0	0	1	0	0	0	0	offset	—	DJNZ offset	B = B - 1; if B ≠ 0 then PC ← PC + offset
0	0	0	1	0	1	1	1	—	—	RLA	A_{1-7} ← A_{0-6}; Cy ← A_{7}; A_{0} ← Cy
0	0	0	1	1	0	0	0	offset	—	JR offset	PC ← PC + offset
0	0	0	1	1	1	1	1	—	—	RRA	A_{0-6} ← A_{1-7}; Cy ← A_{0}; A_{7} ← Cy
0	0	1	CC		0	0	0	offset	—	JR cc,offset	If CC_{0-1} true, PC ← PC + offset (Only 2 bits of CC used: NZ, Z, NC, C)
0	0	1	0	0	0	1	0	addlo	addhi	LD add,HL	(add) ← HL
0	0	1	0	0	1	1	1	—	—	DAA	In N flag = 0 {If A_{0-3} > 9 OR AC = 1 then A ← A + 6; then if A_{4-7} > 9 OR Cy = 1 then A ← A + 0x60} else {do post-subtract DAA}
0	0	1	0	1	0	1	0	addlo	addhi	LD HL,add	HL ← (add)
0	0	1	0	1	1	1	1	—	—	CPL	A ← ¬A
0	0	1	1	0	0	1	0	addlo	addhi	LD add,A	(add) ← A
0	0	1	1	0	1	1	1	—	—	SCF	Cy ← 1
0	0	1	1	1	0	1	0	addlo	addhi	LD A,add	A ← (add)
0	0	1	1	1	1	1	1	—	—	CCF	Cy ← ¬Cy
0	1	DDD			SSS			—	—	LD ddd,sss	DDD ← SSS
0	1	1	1	0	1	1	0	—	—	HALT	Halt
1	0	ALU			SSS			—	—	ADD ADC SUB SBC AND XOR OR CP sss	A ← A [ALU operation] SSS
1	1	CC			0	0	0	—	—	RET cc	If cc true, PC ← (SP), SP ← SP + 2
1	1	RP		0	0	0	1	—	—	POP rp	RP ← (SP), SP ← SP + 2
1	1	CC			0	1	0	addlo	addhi	JP cc,add	If cc true, PC ← add
1	1	0	0	0	0	1	1	addlo	addhi	JP add	PC ← add
1	1	CC			1	0	0	addlo	addhi	CALL cc,add	If cc true, SP ← SP - 2, (SP) ← PC, PC ← add
1	1	RP		0	1	0	1	—	—	PUSH rp	SP ← SP - 2, (SP) ← RP
1	1	ALU			1	1	0	data	—	ADD ADC SUB SBC AND XOR OR CP data	A ← A [ALU operation] data
1	1	N			1	1	1	—	—	RST n	SP ← SP - 2, (SP) ← PC, PC ← N
1	1	0	0	1	0	0	1	—	—	RET	PC ← (SP), SP ← SP + 2
1	1	0	0	1	0	1	1	—	—	CB prefix	See CB prefix table
1	1	0	0	1	1	0	1	addlo	addhi	CALL add	SP ← SP - 2, (SP) ← PC, PC ← add
1	1	0	1	0	0	1	1	port	—	OUT port,A	Port(A:port) ← A (Note: OUT port,A and IN A,port instructions generate a 16-bit port address with the 8-bit immediate port number forming the lower part of the address and the A register forming the upper part. Typically, devices will only decode the lower part. In contrast, the 8080 duplicates the immediate port number on both the upper and lower address bus.)
1	1	0	1	1	0	0	1	—	—	EXX	BC ↔ BC′, DE ↔ DE′, HL ↔ HL′
1	1	0	1	1	0	1	1	port	—	IN A,port	A ← Port(A:port)
1	1	0	1	1	1	0	1	—	—	IX override	HL becomes IX; (HL) becomes (IX + offset)
1	1	1	0	0	0	1	1	—	—	EX (SP),HL	(SP) ↔ HL
1	1	1	0	1	0	0	1	—	—	JP (HL)	PC ← HL
1	1	1	0	1	0	1	1	—	—	EX DE,HL	HL ↔ DE
1	1	1	0	1	1	0	1	—	—	ED prefix	See ED prefix table
1	1	1	1	0	0	1	1	—	—	DI	IFF1 ← IFF2 ← 0; Disable interrupts
1	1	1	1	1	0	0	1	—	—	LD SP,HL	SP ← HL
1	1	1	1	1	0	1	1	—	—	EI	IFF1 ← IFF2 ← 1; Enable interrupts
1	1	1	1	1	1	0	1	—	—	IY override	HL becomes IY; (HL) becomes (IY + offset)
7	6	5	4	3	2	1	0	b2	b3	Mnemonic	Description
SSS DDD					2	1	0	CC		ALU	RP
B					0	0	0	NZ		ADD (A ← A + arg)	BC
C					0	0	1	Z		ADC (A ← A + arg + Cy)	DE
D					0	1	0	NC		SUB (A ← A - arg)	HL
E					0	1	1	C		SBC (A ← A - arg - Cy)	SP or AF
H					1	0	0	PO		AND (A ← A ∧ arg)	
L					1	0	1	PE		XOR (A ← A ⊻ arg)	
(HL)					1	1	0	P		OR (A ← A ∨ arg)	
A					1	1	1	N		CP (A - arg)	
SSS DDD					2	1	0	CC		ALU	

=== Instructions prefixed with ED ===
The ED-prefixed opcodes are a catch-all of new Z80 instructions that could not be encoded in one byte. This group encompasses only 60 of 256 available opcodes.

Opcode								Operands		Mnemonic	Description
7	6	5	4	3	2	1	0	b2	b3	Mnemonic	Description
0	1	DDD			0	0	0	—	—	IN ddd,(C)	DDD ← port(BC) [Except (HL)] (Port number is 16 bits) (Note: Input byte sets the flags unlike IN A,n)
0	1	SSS			0	0	1	—	—	OUT (C),sss	port(BC) ← SSS [Except (HL)] (Port number is 16 bits)
0	1	RP		0	0	1	0	—	—	SBC HL,ss	HL ← HL – ss – CY
0	1	RP		0	0	1	1	addlo	addhi	LD (add), ss	(add) ← RP
0	1	0	0	0	1	0	0	—	—	NEG	A ← 0 - A
0	1	0	0	0	1	0	1	—	—	RETN	PC ← (SP); SP ← SP + 2; IFF1 ← IFF2 (Note: RETN and RETI are identical and restore IFF1. Z80 compatible interrupt devices watch for RETI by sniffing the data bus while M1- is asserted for 0xED followed by 0x4D.)
0	1	0	NN		1	1	0	—	—	IM n	Interrupt mode 0, 1, 2 (encoded 0, 2, 3)
0	1	0	0	0	1	1	1	—	—	LD I,A	interrupt control vector ← A
0	1	RP		1	0	1	0	—	—	ADC HL,ss	HL ← HL + ss + CY
0	1	RP		1	0	1	1	addlo	addhi	LD dd, (add)	RP ← (add)
0	1	0	0	1	1	0	1	—	—	RETI	PC ← (SP); SP ← SP + 2; IFF1 ← IFF2
0	1	0	0	1	1	1	1	—	—	LD R,A	refresh ← A
0	1	0	1	0	1	1	1	—	—	LD A,I	A ← interrupt control vector (Note: LD A,I and LD A,R are the only two LD instructions that set flags. Additionally, IFF2 is loaded into the P/V flag. C unaffected.)
0	1	0	1	1	1	1	1	—	—	LD A,R	A ← refresh
0	1	1	0	0	1	1	1	—	—	RRD	A_{0-3} ← (HL)_{0-3}; (HL)_{7-4} ← A_{0-3}; (HL)_{0-3} ← (HL)_{7-4}
0	1	1	0	1	1	1	1	—	—	RLD	A_{0-3} ← (HL)_{7-4}; (HL)_{0-3} ← A_{0-3}; (HL)_{7-4} ← (HL)_{0-3}
1	0	1	R	D	0	0	0	—	—	LDI LDIR LDD LDDR	(DE) ← (HL); HL ← HL ± 1; DE ← DE ± 1; BC ← BC - 1 (Note: When D = 1, pointers HL and DE decrement. When R = 1, operation repeats until BC or B = 0.) (Note: LDI, LDD, CPI, and CPD set P/V if BC – 1 ≠ 0. This is useful for loop control when not using repeat.)
1	0	1	R	D	0	0	1	—	—	CPI CPIR CPD CPDR	A - (HL); HL ← HL ± 1; BC ← BC - 1 (Note: CPIR/CPDR terminate early if A = (HL).)
1	0	1	R	D	0	1	0	—	—	INI INIR IND INDR	(HL) ← port(BC); HL ← HL ± 1; B ← B – 1 (Note: All block IO instructions output BC, not just C, as the port address.)
1	0	1	R	D	0	1	1	—	—	OUTI OTIR OUTD OTDR	B ← B – 1; port(BC) ← (HL); HL ← HL ± 1
7	6	5	4	3	2	1	0	b2	b3	Mnemonic	Description

=== Instructions prefixed with CB ===
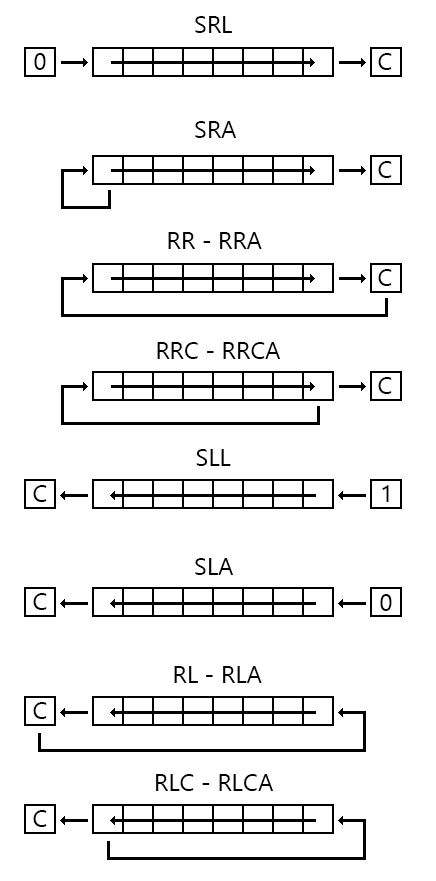
Shift and rotate instructions. SLL is an undefined instruction.

The CB-prefixed opcodes cover shifts and rotates plus the bit test, clear, and set instructions. All of these instructions can be used with any register or memory. The (HL) form of these instructions can be combined with an IX or IY opcode prefix to operate on (IX+d) or (IY+d). This group encompasses 248 of 256 available opcodes.

Opcode								Mnemonic	Description
7	6	5	4	3	2	1	0	Mnemonic	Description
0	0	0	0	0	SSS			RLC r	R_{1-7} ← R_{0-6}; R_{0} ← Cy ← R_{7}
0	0	0	0	1	SSS			RRC r	R_{0-6} ← R_{1-7}; R_{7} ← Cy ← R_{0}
0	0	0	1	0	SSS			RL r	R_{1-7} ← R_{0-6}; Cy ← R_{7}; R_{0} ← Cy
0	0	0	1	1	SSS			RR r	R_{0-6} ← R_{1-7}; Cy ← R_{0}; R_{7} ← Cy
0	0	1	0	0	SSS			SLA r	Cy ← R_{7}; R_{1-7} ← R_{0-6}; R_{0} ← 0
0	0	1	0	1	SSS			SRA r	Cy ← R_{0}; R_{0-6} ← R_{1-7}
0	0	1	1	1	SSS			SRL r	Cy ← R_{0}; R_{0-6} ← R_{1-7}; R_{7} ← 0
0	1	bit			SSS			BIT b,r	R ∧ (1 << b)
1	0	bit			SSS			RES b,r	R ← R ∧ ¬(1 << b)
1	1	bit			SSS			SET b,r	R ← R ∨ (1 << b)
7	6	5	4	3	2	1	0	Mnemonic	Description

=== IX and IY overrides ===
Two opcode prefixes expand the number of Z80 addressing modes to access the new IX and IY index registers:

- Prefix DD changes HL to IX or (HL) to (IX+displacement)
- Prefix FD changes HL to IY or (HL) to (IY+displacement)

The index registers, IX and IY, were intended as flexible 16-bit pointers, enhancing the ability to manipulate memory, stack frames, and data structures. Officially, they were treated as 16-bit only. In reality, they were implemented as a pair of 8-bit registers in the same fashion as the HL register, which is accessible either as 16 bits or separately as the high and low registers. The binary opcodes were identical, but preceded by a new opcode prefix.

==== Undocumented uses of IX/IY ====
Zilog published the opcodes and related mnemonics for the intended functions, but did not document the fact that every opcode that allowed manipulation of the HL register was equally valid for the 8-bit halves of the IX and IY registers. For example, opcode 26h followed by an immediate byte value forms the instruction LD H,n. It will load the n immediate value into the H register. Preceding this two-byte instruction with the IX register's opcode prefix, DD, would instead result in the most significant 8 bits of the IX register being loaded with that same value. A notable exception to this would be instructions similar to LD H,(IX+d) which make use of both the HL and IX or IY registers in the same instruction. In this case the DD prefix is only applied to the (IX+d) portion of the instruction.

Accessing the IX/IY halves can speed some operations. To load DE into IX using official instructions, one could use PUSH DE and POP IX, taking 25 cycles. Using the half-load feature, the same could be coded as LD IXL,E and LD IXH,D, saving 9 cycles but taking an extra byte.

The IX and IY halves can also hold operands for 8-bit arithmetic, logical, and compare instructions, sparing the regular 8-bit registers for other use. Any IX/IY half can be incremented or decremented or loaded to or from any 8-bit register except H or L.

=== Instruction synonyms ===
The Z80 expands the 8080 instruction set and makes it more orthogonal. A byproduct of this is there are certain instruction functions that map to two different instruction encodings. In a few cases there is an 8080 instruction coding that is smaller and faster than the orthogonal Z80 encoding. Some examples:

- The Z80 introduced orthogonal versions of LD RP,(nn) and LD (nn),RP instructions where RP can be any register pair or SP. The Z80 assembler substitutes the 8080 version of LD HL,(nn) and LD (nn),HL to save a byte and four clocks.
- RL A, RR A, RLC A, RRC A, and SLA A instructions are part of the Z80 CB-prefixed rotates. The 8080 RLA, RRA, RLCA, RRCA, and ADD A,A instructions are a byte smaller and twice as fast.
- The Z80 introduced a two-byte unconditional jump, JR. Although larger, the three-byte 8080 JP is two clocks faster.
- The Z80 added two-byte conditional jumps: JR NZ, JR Z, JR NC, and JR C as alternates to the 8080 three byte conditional jumps: JP NZ, JP Z, JP NC, and JP C. Although the two-byte forms are two clocks slower when taken, they are three clocks faster when not taken.
- The Z80 DJNZ instruction is half the size of the 8080 equivalent instructions and one clock faster.
