= Zilog Z180 =

8-bit microprocessor

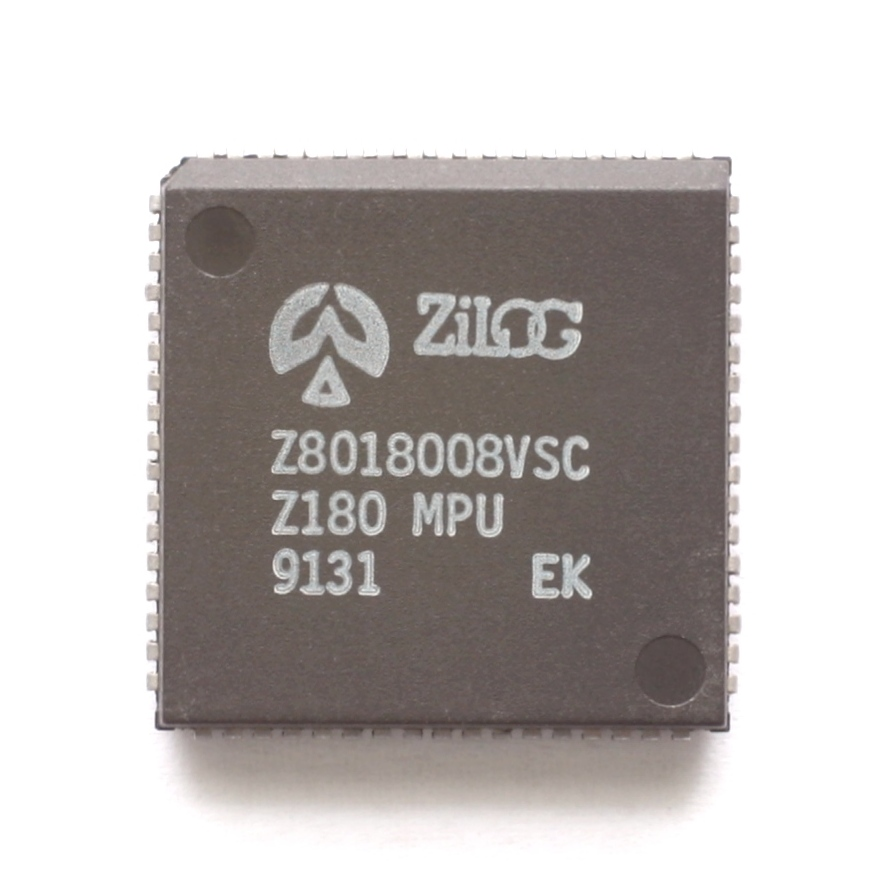
Older Z180 in 68-pin PLCC package (the smaller 80-pin QFP and LQFP packages are more common today.)

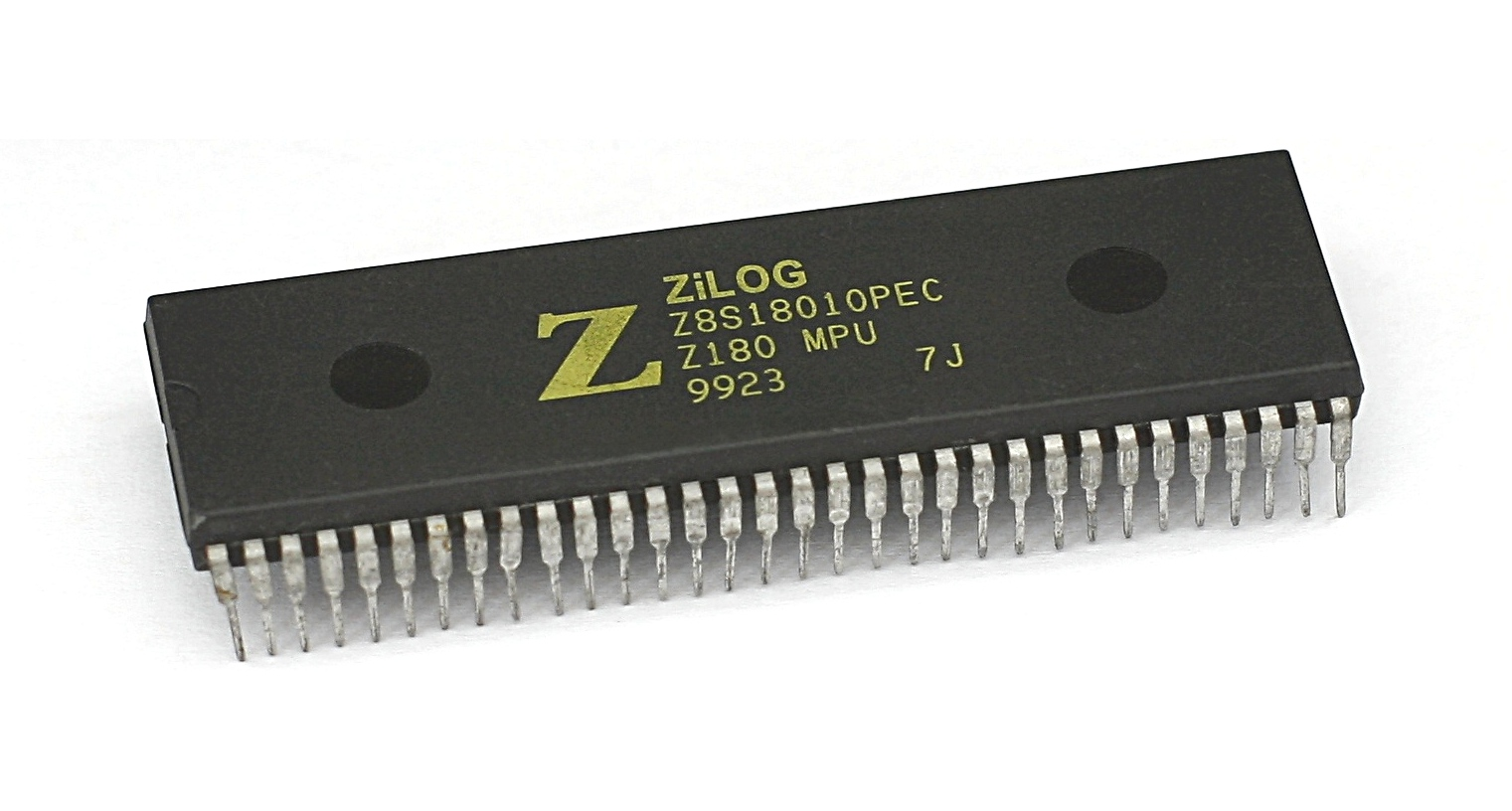
Z8S180 in 64-pin DIP

The Zilog Z180 is an 8-bit microprocessor designed by Zilog as a successor to the Z80. It is compatible with the large base of software written for the Z80 instruction set. The Z180 family adds higher performance and integrated peripheral functions like clock generator, 16-bit counters/timers, interrupt controller, wait-state generators, serial ports and a DMA controller. It uses separate read and write strobes, sharing similar timings with the Z80 and Intel processors. The on-chip memory management unit (MMU) has the capability of addressing up to 1 MB of memory. It is possible to configure the Z180 to operate as the Hitachi HD64180.

== Variants ==
Chip	Speed (MHz)	Timers	I/O	Comm. Contr.	Others
Z80180	6, 8, 10	2	N/S	CPU	1 MB MMU, 2xDMAs, 2xUARTs
Z80181	10	1	16	CPU	1 MB MMU, 2xDMAs, 2xUARTs
Z80182	16, 20, 33	2	Clock, Serial, 24	ESCC, CSIO, UART, PIO	S180 Megacell, 2xESCC channels, 3*8bit IO, 16550 MIMIC
Z80185/Z80195	20, 33	4	7/24	SCC, CSIO, UART	
Z8L180	20	2	Clock Serial	CSIO, UART	1 MB MMU, 2xDMAs, 2xUARTs, 3.3 V Operation
Z8L182	20	2	Clock, Serial, 24	ESCC, CSIO, UART, PIO	S180 Megacell, 2xESCC channels, 3*8bit IO, 16550 MIMIC, 3.3V operation
Z8S180	10, 20, 33	2	Clock Serial	UART, DMA	1 MB MMU, 2xDMAs, 2xUARTs
Z8S183	10, 20, 33	2	Clock Serial	UART, DMA	1 MB MMU, 2xDMAs, 2xUARTs 16550, MIMIC, 3.3V operation
Z8S189	10, 20, 33	2	Clock Serial	UART, DMA	1 MB MMU, 2xDMAs, 2xUARTs, 3.3V operation

== Z80182 ==
The Zilog Z80182, introduced in 1997, is an enhanced, faster version of the older Z80 and is part of the Z180 microprocessor family. It is nicknamed the Zilog Intelligent Peripheral Controller (ZIP). It is also fully static (the clock can be halted and no data in the registers will be lost) and has a low EMI option that reduces the slew rate of the outputs.

The Z80182 can operate at 33 MHz with an external oscillator for 5-volt operation, or at 20 MHz using the internal oscillator for 3.3-volt operation.
