= Boarman =

Boarman is a surname and given name. Notable people with the name include:

Surname:

- Alexander Boarman (1839–1916), United States federal judge in Louisiana
- Andy Boarman (1911–1999), American bluegrass and folk musician
- Bryce Boarman (born 1990), American Paralympic soccer player
- Charles Boarman (1795–1879), career officer in the United States Navy
- Charles Boarman (pioneer) (1828–1880), American pioneer and frontier physician
- Gerald Boarman, North Carolina School of Science and Mathematics
- James Boarman, Alcatraz escape attempter
- William J. Boarman (1946–2021), the 26th Public Printer of the United States

Given name:

- Charles Boarman Harris (1857–1942), American physician and surgeon
- Vira Boarman Whitehouse (1875–1957), owner of the Whitehouse Leather Company, suffragette and early proponent of birth control

== See also ==
- Bohrmann
- Boorman
- Boreman
- Borman
- Bormann
- Bourman
