= Charles Boarman (disambiguation) =

Charles Boarman (1795–1879) was a United States Navy officer.

Charles Boarman may also refer to:

- Charles Boarman (pioneer) (1828–1880), American pioneer and frontier physician
- Charles Boarman Harris (1857–1942), American physician and surgeon

== See also ==
- Boarman
- Charles R. Boardman (1860–1950), American journalist, businessman, and Army National Guard officer
