= Borrman =

Borrman is a surname. Notable people with the surname include:

- Pip Borrman (1954–2009), Australian aerobatics pilot
- Sven Borrman (1933–2004), Swedish weightlifter

== See also ==
- Borman
- Borrmann
