= Mike Fischer =

British businessman

Mike David Fischer CBE is the co-founder of the computer company RM plc.

Fischer graduated with a physics degree from Oxford University. In 1973, with Mike O'Regan (who had an economics degree from Cambridge), Fischer co-founded Research Machines, a British microcomputer and then software company for the educational market. He was CEO for 24 years and became a non-executive director and lifetime president in 1997. He stood down as a non-executive director in 2004, but retains his position as lifetime president of the company.

Fischer is a founder of the Fischer Family Trust which runs projects in health and education. In education, the key project of the Fischer Family Trust has been to change the way school performance is measured in England.

Fischer is also Director of SBL, a (Community Interest) Company dedicated to improving patient treatment options through high quality, collaborative and clinically focused research, and co–founder of Alamy Ltd, a stock photography agency. Fisher is also co-founder and Chair of Videoloft Ltd, a cloud video surveillance software platform.

He and RM co-founder Mike O'Regan were awarded honorary degrees by the Open University in 2002.

== Personal life and education ==
Fischer completed an undergraduate degree in physics at Oxford University in 1971 and a second undergraduate degree in physiological sciences at Oxford University in 1978. He has also been awarded an honorary doctorate from the Open University in 2002 with the other RM cofounder, Mike O’Regan. Fischer was awarded a CBE for services to Business and to Charity in 2006.

== Business ventures ==
=== RM ===
Fischer and Mike O’Regan founded RM (as Research Machines) in 1973 as a mail-order supplier of electronic components. The company has since been expanded to provide information technology products and services to educational organisations and establishments. Fischer was CEO for 24 years and became a non-executive director and lifetime president in 1997. He stood down as a non-executive director in 2004, but retains his position as lifetime president of the company.

After studying Japanese companies, Fischer was heavily influenced by the excellent manufacturing quality standards facilitated by a systemised approach to quality and improvement. This approach is championed by the studies of William Edwards Deming and Joseph M Juran, a.k.a. Six Sigma. According to Fischer, “ensuring high-quality manufacturing standards was the key that would unlock RM's expansion”.

=== Alamy ===
Fischer is the co-founder with James West of Alamy, an online stock photography agency launched in 1999. Alamy was acquired by PA Media Group in February 2020.

=== Videoloft ===
Fisher is co-founder of Videoloft, along with James West of Alamy and Tim Pearson of RM. Videoloft's software cloud-enables traditional CCTV systems, making them inherently more secure and adding powerful business intelligence.

== Philanthropy ==
=== FFT and the Fischer Family Trust in Education ===
Fischer is best known for his work in the education world with FFT. FFT is a non-profit organisation established in 2001 as part of the Fischer Family Trust. It works to provide accurate and insightful information to schools which enables pupils to achieve their full potential and schools to improve.

Since 1991, the Fischer Family Trust is one of the foremost charities in the UK dedicated to improving the educational outcomes of the most vulnerable segment of pupils in UK schools. The trust is mainly involved in undertaking and supporting medical research, education and conservation projects in the UK. It has been the leading UK organisation in highlighting the link between failure to gain foundational skills in literacy by the age of seven, and the impact of this failure on later life chances.

The Fischer Family Trust Apex Project was set up by the trust to work intensively with a small number of core schools and apply a structured improvement process with the objective of eliminating ‘avoidable’ early literacy failure. The project is unique in that it applies a rigorous ‘Deming-Juran’ method to systemising improvement. In 1992, the project identified the elimination of avoidable early literacy failure as the single most important improvement to be made in UK education.

Fischer is also known for his work with Success for All, a classroom improvement project developed by US educationalists Robert Slavin and Nancy Madden. Fischer is a trustee of Success for All UK.

=== COVID-19 Testing and Vitamin D ===
Fischer directs SBL, an independent non-profit medical research laboratory in Oxfordshire. Following suggestions from his team, he converted the lab to testing for COVID-19 in March 2020. The lab was quickly able to provide 250-500 tests a week to local NHS health care workers with a half-day turnaround.

After seeing the impact that testing at SBL had on the local area, Fischer wanted to encourage other labs to follow the example, and created the Covid Volunteer Testing Network, with the hope that it would expand these services and help fight the battle against COVID-19 across the UK. Fischer worked with entrepreneur Tim Perkin and the Fischer Family Trust to provide support in the form of a supply chain of reagents. This later became the Covid Testing Network that has supported UK government Pillar 2 and Pillar 4 testing as well as workplace testing across the UK.

The Fischer Family Trust through SBL has supported research into Vitamin D which has become particularly important in the COVID-19 era.
