= Alamy =

British stock photography agency

Alamy Limited
- Type: Subsidiary
- Industry: Publishing, media, web design, graphic design, stock photography
- Founded: 15 September 1999; 27 years ago
- Founder: Mike Fischer; James West
- Headquarters: Abingdon, Oxfordshire, United Kingdom
- Products: Digital images, video
- Services: Rights-managed and royalty-free images and video
- Parent: PA Media
- Website: www.alamy.com

Alamy Limited (d/b/a alamy) is a British privately owned stock photography agency launched in September 1999. It is an online supplier of stock images, videos, and other image material. Their content comes from agencies and independent photographers, or are collected from news archives, museums, national collections, and public domain content copied from Wikimedia Commons. Its headquarters are in Milton Park, near Abingdon, Oxfordshire, United Kingdom. It has a development and operations centre at Technopark in Trivandrum, Kerala, India, and a sales office in Brooklyn, New York, United States.

== History ==
James West, a graduate of Edinburgh University, was the CEO of Alamy and co-founded the company with Mike Fischer in 1999. Fischer, the ex-chairman and co–founder of the firm, was also co-founder and CEO of RM plc. In 2002, Alamy won an EMMA (Electronic Multimedia Awards) award for technical excellence. The purpose of the award is to recognize excellence in digital media content creation. It also introduced a 24/7 high-resolution download tool for customers. The technical innovation continued with virtual CDs becoming a replacement for royalty-free (RF) image CDs.

In 2003, the firm introduced an international distribution network. Based on the resulting increased sales, it increased the royalty payments for its contributors in 2006. Since 2002 Alamy, has paid out over $100 million to its contributors. In March 2004 one million images were available on the site and by October 2007 there were 10 million images online. In 2010, the firm created an iPad app to showcase its images. In 2011, Alamy launched a live news service, and in 2012 it started to accept live news images from mobile phones which upgraded their collection to 25 million images. Also in 2011, the company expanded its international sales unit with teams being introduced in Germany, Australia and The Middle East. In 2012, Alamy introduced the Alamy iQ, video, and creative search results.

In 2015, Alamy's iPhone app Stockimo was shortlisted in The Drum's Marketing on Mobile Awards (MOMAs) for the Best Mobile/Tablet Consumer Facing App. In 2017, Alamy announced their new CEO, Andy Harding. In 2018, James West resumed his position as CEO. In December 2018, Alamy announced that they would be increasing their commission from 50% to 60% of the sales value, reducing their payments to their contributors to just 40% of the payment received from customers. This announcement was superseded a couple of weeks later by a further announcement that commission would remain at 50% on material that was exclusively available only on Alamy. In February 2020, Alamy was acquired by PA Media Group. Co-founder James West stepped down from his position as CEO but remains as an advisory board member. Emily Shelley is the current managing director of Alamy.

== Criticism ==
On 16 February 2015, Alamy informed its members of changes to the contributor contract. These changes were condemned by the photography industry bodies, the National Union of Journalists, and Editorial Photographers UK (EPUK) who said "Alamy, it seems is trying to establish a perpetual and irrevocable contract with images that they have previously sold on our behalf at a time when this was not the case, which allows them to continue selling them even after the contract with the photographer has been terminated. ... The provision would last for the full term of copyright and we see it as unreasonably extensive." Alamy responded by stating that the changes only reflect the company work style and do not represent a significant shift. In turn, their reply was characterized by the documentary photographer and Alamy contributor David Hoffman as "misleading and evasive".

Alamy has been criticized for claiming copyright of public domain or otherwise freely licensed images. Carol M. Highsmith sued Alamy in July 2016 for selling photographs without attribution she had donated to the Library of Congress. License Compliance Services, part of Alamy, had also sent an e-mail to the "This is America!" foundation, a foundation that was founded by Highsmith. The e-mail stated: "We have seen that an image or image(s) represented by Alamy has been used for online use by your company. According to Alamy's records your company doesn't have a valid license for use of the image(s)." It further demanded a settlement fee of $120 for the infringement Highsmith was accused of. The photograph in question was not an infringement but an original work of authorship of Highsmith. The claim by Highsmith was dismissed because she had signed away her copyrights, putting the photographs in the public domain.

In 2023, Neue Zürcher Zeitung journalists found works by Iranian artist Meysam Azarneshin on Alamy's website. Although not being authentic photographs, the images were not marked as such or labeled as work of an artificial intelligence. When confronted, Alamy stated that an image in question has not been created by an AI but was a "composite" image, a mix of elements from multiple other images. Alamy responded that it would actively remove AI generated content.

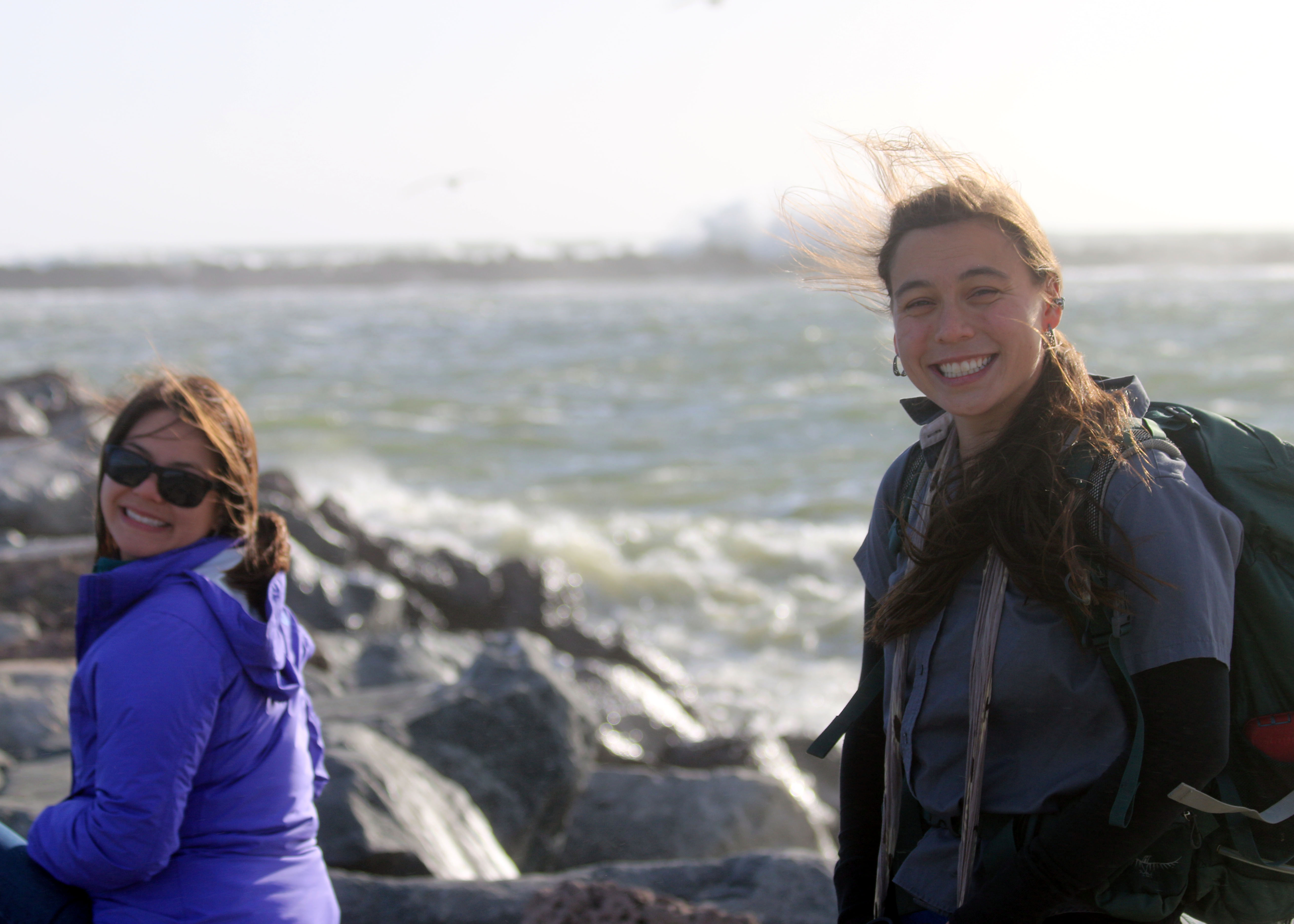
Photo from the USFWS Flickr stream that was made available free of charge with a PD-mark.

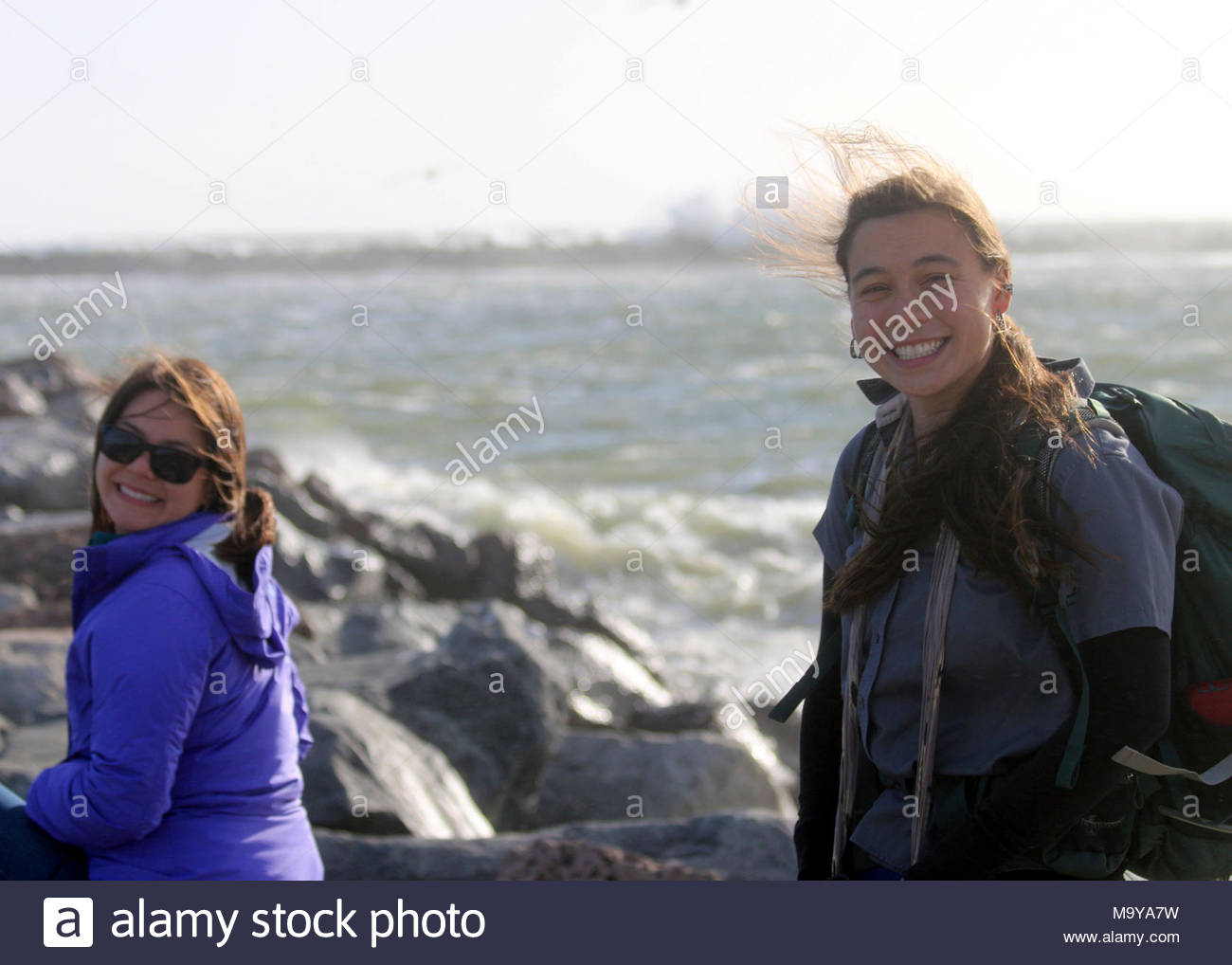
The same image, watermarked by Alamy and sold on their website. It was without attribution to the photographer or source.

== See also ==
- Image hosting service
- List of online image archives
- Stock photography
