= Charles Boarman =

American naval officer

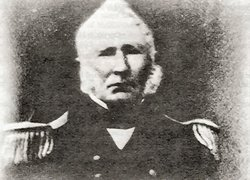
- Rear Admiral Charles Boarman
- Born: December 24, 1795; Bryantown, Maryland, US
- Died: September 13, 1879 (aged 83); Martinsburg, West Virginia, US
- Burial place: Saint Joseph's Cemetery
- Military career
- Branch: United States Navy
- Service years: 1811–1876
- Rank: Rear admiral
- Commands: USS Weasel; USS Java; USS Hudson; USS Vandalia; USS Grampus; USS Fairfield; USS Brandywine; Commandant Brooklyn Navy Yard

Charles Boarman (December 24, 1795 – September 13, 1879) was a career officer in the United States Navy. He entered the naval service shortly before the War of 1812 and served until 1876, subsequently retiring as a rear admiral. He held a number of important posts, both in peace and wartime, in the Mediterranean, West Indies and Brazil Squadrons and as commandant of the Brooklyn Navy Yard. He was also assigned to special duty during the American Civil War and a member of the U.S. Naval Board at Washington, D.C.

After attending naval school at the Washington Navy Yard, Boarman saw service as a young midshipmen aboard USS Jefferson during the War of 1812 and later took part in anti-piracy operations in the early 1820s. He commanded a number of warships between 1827 and 1850, most notably, USS Brandywine during the Mexican–American War. In 1876, Boarman was promoted to rear admiral on the retired list and died in Martinsburg, West Virginia, three years later.

He was among several of Catholic background, such as John Cassin, Patrick McDonough, and Philemon C. Wederstrandt, to become high-ranking naval officers in the early years of the U.S. Navy. He was also, at the time of his death, the longest serving naval officer on the Navy Register with 68 years service. The Boarman family home, the Boarman House, occupied by the family for over a century, is a state historical landmark in West Virginia.

== Early life and career ==
Painting of Boarman as a junior officer

Charles Boarman was born in Bryantown, Maryland, on December 24, 1795. He was the son of Mary (née Edelen; c. 1754 – April 23, 1836) and Charles Boarman Sr. (1751 – 1819), a professor at Georgetown College. The Boarmans were among the oldest families in colonial Maryland. Its patriarch, Major William Boarman (1630–1709), was an officer and administrator under Lord Baltimore, first arriving in the colony in 1645, and became a major landholder in present-day Charles County. Many of Charles Boarman's relatives were in the clergy including his uncle Rev. Sylvester Boarman and distant cousins Rev. Father Edelen and Rev. Cornelius Thomas, the latter a rector of St. Anne's Church in Baltimore. Boarman's aunt Sallie Edelen was a Sister in the Poor Clares in France before having to flee the country during the Reign of Terror; four of his cousins were among the first women to enter Baltimore's Carmelite Convent.

Boarman's father was also, at one time, studying to enter the priesthood. He was educated at the Jesuit College of Liege, Belgium, and was a scholastic of the Society at the time of the suppression of the Jesuits in 1773. As a result, he was released from his vows and returned to Maryland where he met and married his future wife. The Boarman family lived on a farm in Charles County while Charles Boarman Sr. resided at Georgetown University. In 1799, he moved the family to Georgetown, where they lived in a brick house on the university grounds. After Boarman Sr. died, the house was occupied by Mrs. Susan Decatur, widow of Captain Stephen Decatur, until her death in 1860. The property was later sold and the house was torn down; the site is now included in the university's baseball field.

The younger Charles Boarman was educated at Georgetown from 1803 to 1808. In 1811, Boarman's father wrote to Robert Brent, the mayor of Washington, D.C. and U.S. Army paymaster, asking for a letter of recommendation for his son in regards to a midshipman's commission in the United States Navy. In August of that year, on behalf of Boarman's father, Brent wrote to then United States Secretary of the Navy Paul Hamilton endorsing the commission. In addition to the father's letter was a personal application from a 16-year-old "Charley" Boarman himself.

Navy Career
Midshipman – 1811
- 1813: USS Erie
- 1814: USS Jefferson
- 1814–17: USS Erie

Lieutenant – 1817
- 1817: USS Peacock
- 1817: Washington Navy Yard
- 1823: USS John Adams
- 1824: USS Decoy
- 1827–28: USS Weasel
- 1828: USS Java
- 1829: USS Delaware

Executive Officer – 1830
- 1830: USS Hudson
- 1830: USS Vandalia
- 1830: USS Hudson
- 1836: USS Grampus

Commander – 1837
- 1837–1840: USS Fairfield

Captain – 1844
- 1844–1850: USS Brandywine
- 1852–1855: Brooklyn Navy Yard
- 1855–61: Reserve list
- 1861–65: Special duties
- 1863–65: United States Naval Board

Commodore – 1867

Rear Admiral – 1876

Hamilton approved Boarman's application a day after receiving the letter. He attended instruction in the Washington Navy Yard and was under the tuition of Chaplain Andrew Hunter, a military chaplain in the Continental Army and mathematics professor in Princeton University, while in Washington. Boarman was assigned to the sloop USS Erie in Baltimore upon the completion of his training in September 1813. He later served aboard the brig USS Jefferson seeing action on Lake Ontario during the War of 1812. He was one of several Georgetown alumni, including Thomas Blackstone, William Ford, Thomas Robinson, John Rogers, and Clement Sewall to participate in the war.

=== Service in the Mediterranean, West Indies, and Brazil squadrons ===
Boarman returned to Erie at the end of the war as part of the Mediterranean Squadron and won promotion to lieutenant on March 5, 1817. After a brief time sailing with the West India Squadron on the sloop USS Peacock he was stationed at the Washington Navy Yard. On March 21, 1820, Boarman was married to Mary Ann "Nancy" Abell, daughter of John Abell and Sarah Forrest, wealthy Virginian landowners, in Jefferson County. He soon went to sea again seeing service on USS John Adams (1823) and USS Decoy (1824) as part of the U.S. Navy's anti-piracy operations in the West Indies. On July 24, 1824, Boarman temporarily took command of the schooner USS Weazel from Commodore David Porter during which time he was on convoy duty and patrolled for pirates. That summer, Boarman captured a pirate ship off the coast of Crab Island but its crew managed to escape to shore. In September, he escorted three American merchant ships from Havana, Cuba, to Campeachy, and then carried $65,000 from Tampico which was to be shipped to New York. In July 1825, Boarman was one of several officers of the West Indies Squadron which testified at the naval court of inquiry and court martial of Commodore Porter.

Boarman received his first command, USS Weazel (1827), and then transferred to the frigates USS Java (1828) and USS Delaware (1829), both flagships of the Mediterranean Squadron. In 1830, he was made executive officer of the Brazil Squadron's flagship USS Hudson. In September, he took temporary command of USS Vandalia while Captain John Gallagher left to testify in the court martial of fellow Captain Beekman V. Hoffman of USS Boston. He went back to Hudson after Gallagher's return and remained on board until 1836 when he was reassigned to the West India Squadron and given command of the schooner USS Grampus. On February 9, 1837, he was made a full commander, and in 1840 captained the sloop USS Fairfield. It was during this period that Solomon H. Sanborn, master-at-arms of Fairfield from 1837 to 1839, accused the ship's officers, including Boarman, of complicity in illegal coltings and floggings with cat o' nine tails by not reporting them in the ship's logbook. He also alleged that Boarman used the discipline tribunal to keep a member of the crew, seaman John Smith, on board past the term of his enlistment with a court martial trial. In 1840, Sanborn published a 40-page pamphlet in New York describing his experiences, however, no charges were ever brought against any officers of Fairfield.

Four years later, on March 29, 1844, Boarman won his captain's commission and assumed command of the Brazil Squadron's flagship USS Brandywine. Boarman held this command throughout the Mexican–American War and, between 1847 and 1850, embarked on a three-year voyage.

=== Commandant of the Brooklyn Navy Yard ===
After leaving the Brazil Squadron, Boarman succeeded Captain William D. Salter as commander of the Brooklyn Navy Yard and remained in charge of the facility from October 14, 1852 to October 1, 1855. In the four-year period he and his family were stationed in Brooklyn one of his daughters, Mary Jane Boarman, began a relationship with William Henry Broome, longtime deputy collector of the New York Custom House; the two may have been introduced through Broome's brother John L. Broome who was serving as a marine lieutenant at the navy yard. They were married in a modest ceremony at the Commandant's House, officiated by Archbishop John Hughes, on October 18, 1853; the family regularly attended Sunday Mass at St. James' Cathedral, in all kinds of weather, where Boarman was a pew holder. Boarman later bought the house and lot that Mary Ann lived at in Brooklyn and, after her husband's death in 1876, left the property to her in his will.

During his tenure at the navy yard Boarman supervised the fitting out of the Japan expedition under Commodore Matthew C. Perry. In May 1855, responding to reports by the Pierce Administration of a possible filibustering expedition being headed by Henry L. Kinney, Boarman used the naval forces under his command to form a blockade around Kinney's ship moored at an East River wharf effectively blocking Kinney and associate Joseph W. Fabens from leaving New York Harbor; the two were subsequently arrested. Four months after this incident, on September 18, 1855, Boarman was placed on the reserve list, less than a month before turning over command of the yard to Captain Abraham Bigelow, holding the rank of captain.

=== Later career ===
Boarman was recalled to duty upon the start of the American Civil War. Although he was born a southerner, and a longtime resident of Martinsburg, Virginia, he remained with the Union and supported the secession of West Virginia from Virginia proper. Two of his sons-in-law, Robert P. Bryarly and Jeremiah Harris, the latter a member of the famed Ashby's Cavalry, both served in the Confederate Army. In a letter to one of his sons, written at the start of the war, Boarman "declared his steadfast allegiance to the flag of his country, which he had sworn to defend". Technically a slave owner through marriage to his wife, Boarman immediately freed his slaves and "faced bravely the financial hardship that followed this act". Boarman was detained on special duty throughout the war, his "rare executive capacities peculiarly fitting him for such service", and in 1863 was appointed to the U.S. Naval Board in Washington, DC. On March 12, 1867, he was promoted to the rank of commodore. Boarman retired at the rank of rear admiral nine years later.

Boarman eventually returned to Martinsburg where he and his wife spent their final years. Charles and Mary Ann Boarman had originally lived in Maryland before moving to Martinsburg to raise their family; they had 13 children together, however, only 10 survived to adulthood. In March 1870, the couple celebrated their 50th wedding anniversary. Mary Ann Boarman died on September 26, 1875. Mary Ann, who converted to Catholicism to marry her husband, was an active member of the local diocese, St. Joseph's Catholic Church, and spent much of her time involved in charities to help the sick and the poor while Charles Boarman was away at sea. Her loss was mourned by the townspeople with one writing: "In her death we lose one of our most charitable citizens; she will be missed by very many of the poor of Martinsburg; she was always seeking the sick and administering to their wants. She was truly an angel of mercy and charity and a strict and consistent member of the church". Boarman was also involved in church activities and, when their children were younger, wrote to a local convent asking the Mother Superior for Nuns to teach the Catholic children of Martinsburg.

Boarman died in Martinsburg on September 13, 1879. Boarman was survived by ten children, four sons and six daughters, including frontier physician Dr. Charles Boarman (1828–1880), who was among the first pioneers to settle in present-day Amador County, California. Two of his daughters also married into prominent families; Susan Martha Boarman married Virginia landowner Jeremiah Harris and Mary Jane Boarman became the wife of William Henry Broome, deputy collector of the New York Custom House. His grandson Dr. Charles Boarman Harris (1857–1942), a well known pioneer physician in northwestern Minnesota and the Dakota Territory, helped establish the oldest settlement in the state North Dakota. Andrew "Andy" F. Boarman (1910–1999), a popular banjo and bluegrass musician, was the great-grandson of Charles Boarman.

At the time of his death Boarman had been the longest serving officer in the U.S. Navy Register, with over 68 years of service, and the U.S. Naval Department issued a special general order to recognize his passing.

== Boarman House ==
The Boarman family home, commonly known as the Boarman House, is an historical landmark in the state of West Virginia. It is one of the oldest brick buildings in downtown Martinsburg and part of the city's walking tour of Civil War landmarks. Originally built by Philip Nadenbousch, it was purchased by Lieutenant Charles Boarman in 1832 and remained in the Boarman family for over a century before being sold to the King's Daughters Circle in December 1943, and then to the Sisters of the Holy Ghost in 1953; the building was used for apartments and various offices, including an employment office for returning World War II servicemen, during this time. It was purchased in 1980 by West Virginia nonprofit corporation Associates for Community Development and, after extensive restorations, housed the Boarman Arts Center and the Martinsburg-Berkeley County Convention and Visitors Bureau from 1987 to 2001; the building featured Boarman's navigator's log and two portraits, one when he bought the house as a young lieutenant and the other as an older officer. In October 2005, the house was sold to a Leesburg, Virginia, couple, Chester and Jeanne Martin, who planned to turn it into the city's first bed and breakfast.
