= Videoloft =

British cloud computing provider

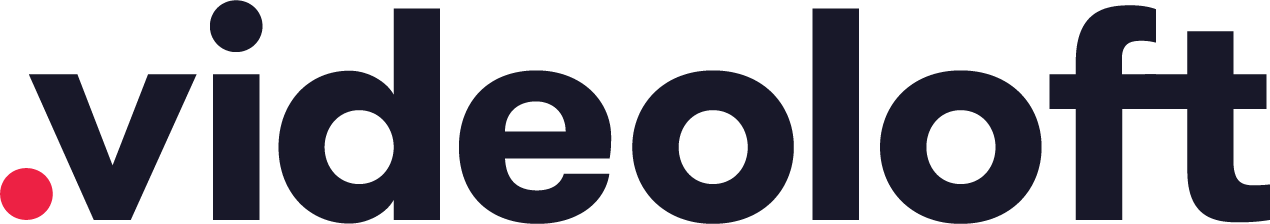
- Formerly: Manything (2012–2019)
- Type: Private
- Industry: Video surveillance Cloud computing
- Founded: June 27, 2012; 14 years ago
- Founders: James West; Mike Fischer
- Headquarters: Milton Park, Abingdon, Oxfordshire, United Kingdom
- Area served: Worldwide
- Key people: James West (CEO)
- Products: Cloud video-surveillance platform, Cloud Adapter
- Services: Video-surveillance-as-a-service (VSaaS)
- Website: videoloft.com

Videoloft, formerly known as Manything, is a privately held British technology company that provides cloud-based video-surveillance-as-a-service (VSaaS). The company is headquartered on Milton Park in Oxfordshire. It is mainly known for its Manything app.

== History ==
Videoloft was incorporated on 27 June 2012 as Manything by James West and Mike Fischer. Its first product, released under the name Manything ("monitor anything"), was a mobile app that repurposed old smartphones as DIY security cameras.

In 2017, Manything shifted from the consumer DIY to the professional channel and began a joint initiative with Hikvision to sell cloud recording to security dealers. In August 2019, Manything was renamed as Videoloft, while keeping the Manything app for its legacy users.

From 2020 onward, Videoloft announced a series of product milestones, including the launch of cloud-based video analytics with object and text recognition, native 4K cloud recording, direct integrations with manufacturers such as Vivotek, and larger 16- and 64-channel Cloud Adapter models for enterprise sites. During the same period, the company expanded its operations to the United States. In July 2026, Videoloft launched a Windows-based Virtual Cloud Adapter, which allows compatible cameras and recorders to connect to its cloud platform without a physical Cloud Adapter. The software supports up to 64 channels.

== Operations ==
Videoloft operates on a software-as-a-service model. It maintains its research-and-development and administrative headquarters in Abingdon, with sales staff in North America and channel distributors across Europe, the Middle East and Asia-Pacific.
