= Bloomery (disambiguation) =

A bloomery is a type of furnace once used widely for smelting iron from its oxides.

Bloomery may also refer to:

- Bloomery, Hampshire County, West Virginia
- Bloomery, Jefferson County, West Virginia
