= USS Forrest =

Gleaves-class destroyer

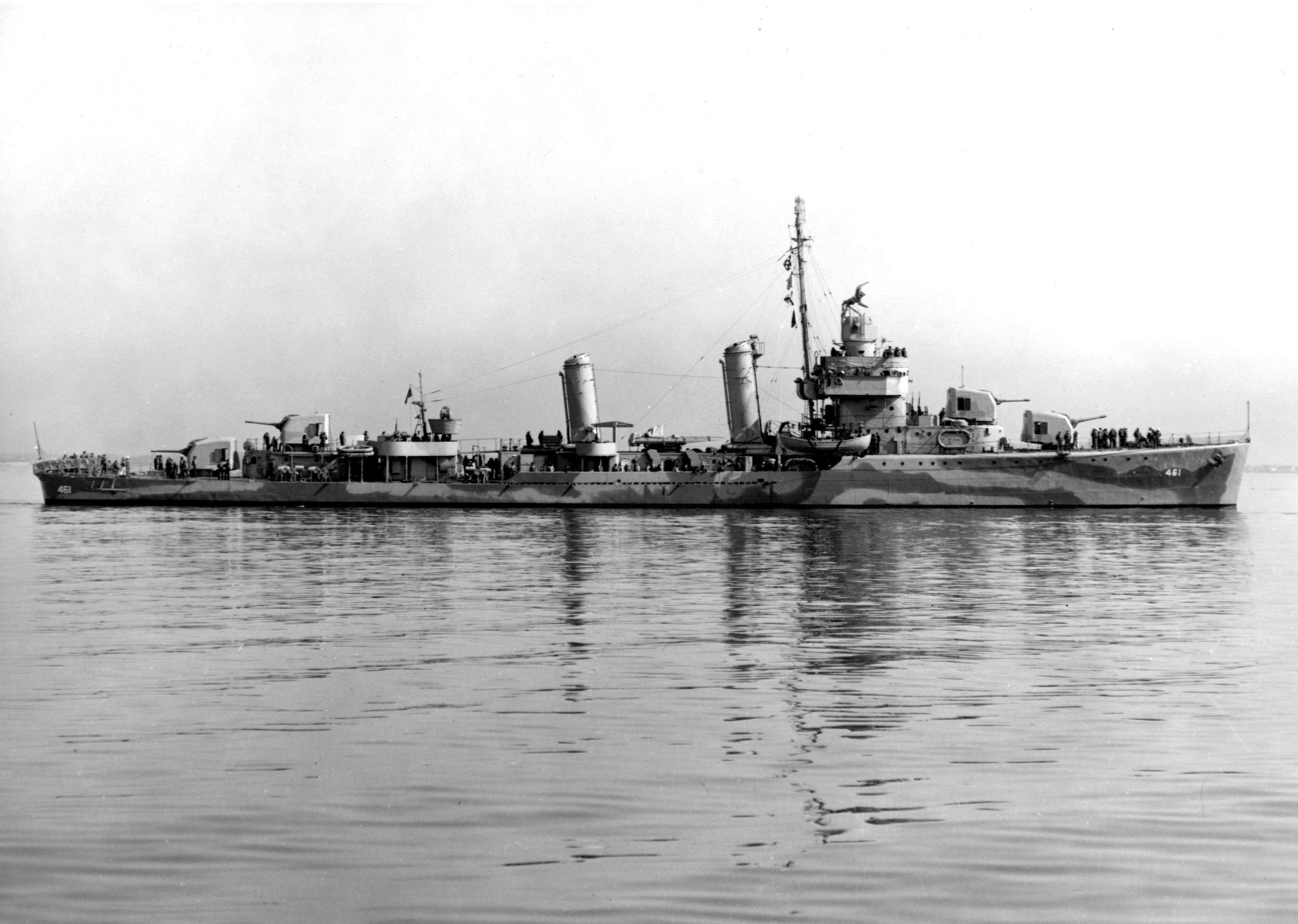
- USS Forrest (DD-461) underway off the Boston Naval Shipyard in April 1942

History

United States
- Name: Forrest
- Namesake: Dulany Forrest
- Builder: Boston Navy Yard
- Laid down: 6 January 1941
- Launched: 14 June 1941
- Commissioned: 13 January 1942
- Reclassified: DMS-24, 15 November 1944
- Decommissioned: 30 November 1945
- Stricken: 19 December 1945
- Fate: Sold 20 November 1946, broken up for scrap

General characteristics
- Class & type: Gleaves-class destroyer
- Displacement: 1,630 tons
- Length: 348 ft 3 in (106.15 m)
- Beam: 36 ft 1 in (11.00 m)
- Draft: 11 ft 10 in (3.61 m)
- Propulsion: 50,000 shp (37,000 kW); 4 boilers; 2 propellers
- Speed: 37.4 knots (69 km/h)
- Range: 6,500 nmi (12,000 km; 7,500 mi) at 12 kn (22 km/h; 14 mph)
- Complement: 16 officers, 260 enlisted
- Armament: 5 × 5 in (127 mm) DP guns, 6 × 0.5 in (12.7 mm) guns, 6 × 20 mm AA guns, 10 × 21 in (533 mm) torpedo tubes, 2 × depth charge tracks

USS Forrest (DD-461/DMS-24), was a Gleaves-class destroyer of the United States Navy.

== Namesake ==
Dulany Forrest entered the Navy as a midshipman on 22 May 1809. He served on the frigates USS President and USS Essex. Attached to the Lake Erie Station in the War of 1812, Acting Lieutenant Forrest was severely wounded while serving on the flagship USS Lawrence in the Battle of Lake Erie on 10 September 1813. His action won him commendation from Commodore Oliver Hazard Perry.

Following the war he served on USS Java and USS John Adams and commanded schooners USS Beagle and USS Porpoise in the campaign against West Indies pirates. Lieutenant Forrest died while in command of the store ship USS Decoy in the Caribbean on 1 October 1825.

== Construction and commissioning ==
Forrest was launched on 14 June 1941 by Boston Navy Yard; sponsored by Miss Eileen F. Thomson, 14, of Chappaqua, New York, a great-grandniece of Lt. Forrest. The ship was commissioned on 13 January 1942. She was reclassified DMS-24 on 15 November 1944.

== Service history ==
=== 1942, including Operation Torch ===
Forrest sailed from Boston 15 June 1942 for NS Argentia, Newfoundland, to augment the escort of the aircraft carrier Ranger, with whose force she returned to Newport on 22 June. On 1 July she sailed with the Ranger group for the coast of West Africa, where the carrier flew off Army aircraft for the burgeoning base at Accra. Returning to Norfolk on 5 August, Forrest served in training operations, submarine searches, and coastal escort duty until 21 October, when she arrived at Bermuda to join the Ranger group for the invasion of North Africa. She screened air operations covering the landings at Safi, Casablanca, and Fedhala from 8 to 12 November, then served in an antisubmarine patrol in advance of an incoming convoy until 18 November. Forrest escorted a convoy to a point off Norfolk, then turned back to Bermuda to rendezvous with the cruiser Augusta with whom she returned to Norfolk 30 November.

=== 1943 ===
Between 2 December 1942 and 27 March 1943, Forrest twice crossed the Atlantic screening Ranger to an ocean launching point off Casablanca as well as serving on coastal and Gulf of Mexico escort duty. After training in Casco Bay, Maine, she joined the Ranger group for patrol duty out of Argentia, Newfoundland, between 17 May and 24 July, then replenished at Boston for the crossing to Scapa Flow, Orkney Islands. From this base of the British Home Fleet, the Ranger group patrolled in search of German naval forces, and on 4 October struck with great success at the shipping and shore installations at Bodø, Norway. In October she sailed south to join the escort for a British carrier returning from the Mediterranean to Scapa Flow, and in November sortied in a combined task force to patrol the northwest coast of Norway covering the passage of a convoy to Russia.

=== 1944 ===
Returning to Boston for brief overhaul 3 December 1943, Forrest spent the months of January and February 1944 training precommissioning crews for new destroyers, and escorting the aircraft carrier Hornet during her shakedown training off Bermuda. Between 7 March and 2 April, she patrolled the Atlantic with the hunter-killer group headed by the escort carrier Guadalcanal. Forrest sailed from Norfolk 20 April for Northern Ireland, and took up escort duties around the British Isles as men and ships were concentrated for the Normandy invasion. When bad weather postponed the landings, originally intended for 5 June, Forrest was sent out on 4 June to recall convoys which had already sailed, bound for Utah Beach. During the actual invasion of 6 June, she screened transports lying in the Baie de la Seine, and on 12, 16, and 17 June, she bombarded shore targets to aid the troops advancing ashore. After escorting battleships to Plymouth, England, 18 June, Forrest returned to the assault area 21 June to cover sweeping operations off the Cotentin Peninsula. She engaged shore batteries on 22 and 24 June, returning to the Isle of Portland, England, the next day.

Four days later Forrest got underway for Belfast, Oran, and Taranto, from which she sailed 11 August 1944 for the invasion of southern France, arriving in the inner fire support area off St. Tropez on 15 August. For the next two months, she escorted convoys from Palermo, Naples, Ajaccio, and Oran to the southern coast of France, guarding the men and supplies which made the push northward possible. She returned to Norfolk 8 November for conversion to a high speed minesweeper.

=== 1945 and fate ===
Forrest trained in Chesapeake Bay for Pacific duty, for which she sailed 17 January 1945, calling at San Diego and Pearl Harbor for further training and arriving Ulithi on 9 March 1945. Ten days later she sortied for minesweeping operations to clear Okinawa waters for the assault on 1 April, after which she served in patrol, screened smaller minesweepers, performed local escort missions, and carried put the usual multiplicity of destroyer assignments. Several times she assisted ships stricken by kamikaze attacks, and on 27 May her own turn came. Three enemy aircraft were sighted, two of which she downed. The third, however, crashed her starboard side at the waterline, killing 5 and wounding 13 of her men. As damage control and fire fighting measures were being taken she headed for Kerama Retto and repairs.

Forrest sailed from Okinawa on 25 June 1945 for the east coast, reaching Boston 6 August 1945. There she was decommissioned on 30 November 1945, and sold 20 November 1946.

Forrest received six battle stars for World War II service.
