= Borman =

Borman is a surname. Notable people with the surname include:

- Anne de Borman (1881–1962), Belgian tennis player
- Brittany Borman (born 1989), American track athlete
- Danleigh Borman (born 1985), South African soccer player
- Frank Borman (1928–2023), American astronaut
  - The Frank Borman Expressway in Indiana named after him
- Gail Borman (born 1963), English footballer
- Geoffrey D. Borman, American quantitative methodologist and policy analyst
- Gloria Borman, South African politician
- Godfrey Borman (1939–2019), South African cricketer
- Jan Borman, 15th-century Flemish sculptor
- Johannes Borman (1620–1679), Dutch painter
- John de Borman (born 1954), British-French cinematographer
- Lorraine Borman, American computer scientist
- Léopold de Borman (1909–1979), Belgian tennis player
- Malaya Borman, Indian politician
- Moritz Borman (1955–2026), German film producer
- Paul de Borman (1879–1948), Belgian tennis player
- Paul D. Borman (born 1939), American federal judge
- Terry Borman, American luthier (violin maker)
- Tracy Borman (born 1972), British historian

== See also ==
- Borman (crater), a lunar impact crater
- Boreman
- Boorman
- Bormann
