= Borrmann =

Borrmann is a German surname. Notable people with the surname include:

- Elmar Borrmann (born 1957), German fencer
- Gerhard Borrmann (1908–2006), German physicist
- Joachim Borrmann, recipient of Knight's Cross of the Iron Cross
- Mechtild Borrmann (born 1960), German writer, author of several detective novels
- Richard Borrmann (1852–1931), German architect and classical archaeologist
- Robert Borrmann, birth name of Eniac, a German composer and record producer specializing in house music and techno
- Bettina Borrmann Wells (1874–?), Bavarian-born English suffragette who toured the United States as an organizer and lecturer

== See also ==
- the Borrmann effect (after Gerhard Borrmann), the anomalous increase in the intensity of X-rays transmitted through a crystal when it is being set up for Bragg reflection
- Borman
- Bormann
