= RM Nimbus =

British computer

RM Nimbus PC-186
- Developer: Research Machines Limited
- Type: Personal computer
- Released: 1985
- Media: 3.5-inch floppy disk
- Operating system: MS-DOS
- CPU: 80186 at 8 MHz
- Memory: 192 KB upgradeable to maximum 1024 KB
- Connectivity: Microsoft MS-Net (optional)
- Website: www.rm.com

RM Nimbus was a range of personal computers from British company Research Machines (now RM Education) sold from 1985 until the early 1990s, after which the designation Nimbus was discontinued. The first of these computers, the RM Nimbus PC-186, was not IBM PC compatible, but its successors the PC-286 and PC-386 were. RM computers were predominantly sold to schools and colleges in the United Kingdom for use as LAN workstations in classrooms.

== Models ==
=== PC-186 ===
The RM Nimbus PC-186 was a 16-bit microcomputer introduced in 1985. It is one of a small number of computers based on the Intel 80186 processor, a version of the Intel 8086 (as used by the IBM PC) originally intended as a processor for embedded systems.

It ran MS-DOS 3.1 but was not IBM PC compatible. The PC-186 could run Windows versions up to and including Windows 3.0, but only in real mode, as protected mode was only available on 286 or higher processors.

Most PC-186 systems were used as workstations within a local area network and were supplied without a hard disk. The operating system was started from a floppy disk or via a remote boot ROM on its network interface card, connecting to the LAN's fileserver. Stand-alone workstations were rarer but available with either twin floppy drives or a 20Mbyte hard drive and single floppy drive.

==== I/O Connectors ====
Mouse - 9-pin D-Sub connector, sometimes confused as a serial port, it uses quadrature signalling
Keyboard - Earlier models - Proprietary keyboard port, Later models - PS/2 keyboard port
Video - 5-pin DIN plug with TTL RGB output compatible with BBC Micro monitor connectors - modified CGA output
Parallel - Optional via expansion card - usually with BBC Micro 'user port' alongside- both with ribbon pin connectors
Network -BNC connector - Zilog Z-NET, Ethernet expansion cards were available for later models - both allowed network boot
Piconet - a proprietary serial interface for connecting peripherals
Power - Standard IEC connector in and out for monitor supply

=== X Series: AX/VX ===
The RM Nimbus AX and VX models were launched in 1986 and used the 80286 (later the 80386) processor. They were fully IBM-compatible, as were all subsequent RM computers. The AX and VX were offered for use as a network file server or as a high-end workstation. They employed either EGA or VGA graphics cards, and were equipped with an ESDI interface for a hard drive, as well as a 3½" floppy drive. By default they were equipped with a Zilog Z-Net interface card, but a second Ethernet card could be added alongside to allow both network interfaces to be used simultaneously, however, the two network interfaces were not able to be bridged. Expansion cards could be added to standard 8-bit and 16-bit ISA sockets, which were both on the motherboard, and on an attached expansion board which was supplied as standard.

=== M Series: PC-286 and PC-386 ===
RM released PCs based on Intel 286 and 386 processors under the RM Nimbus name. The PC-286 and early PC-386 versions were termed the M Series due to the MCA bus used, and had a similar case design to that used by later models of the PC-186.

=== S Series: PC-386 and later ===
Later RM PCs using the 386 processor used an ISA bus and were shipped in a particularly ("S" for) slimline desktop case with only two 3.5" drive bays. The processor typically ran at 16 or 25MHz. Later models dropped the Nimbus name, although it was still used late enough to appear on some early (and still ISA-based) 486 models shipped in slightly taller (2 x 5.25" bay) cases. By this point, RM's computers were essentially ordinary IBM clones being sold specifically to the education market, with standard processors and buses, operating systems and software, as well as the normal ports (5-pin AT keyboard, 9-pin serial - including the mouse, 15-pin HD-sub VGA - although some 386 models used the less common 9-pin variant, etc), and the previous non-standard holdovers from the 380Z days long since abandoned.

=== Backward compatibility with the PC-186 ===
Despite moving to a standard IBM-compatible architecture from the X series onwards, RM somewhat unusually maintained backwards compatibility with software written for their original Nimbus model by way of a "PC186" program that could be launched from MS-DOS or via a Windows icon, that would load a BIOS extension TSR and restart Windows in Real Mode. Various configuration options could be set before launch, and returning to normal IBM-compatible mode was a simple matter of running the same program again with a particular option switch.

== RM Networks ==
RM Nimbus PCs were usually connected to local area network supplied by RM. The company's initial network solution was RM Net, comprising RM Nimbus PC-186 workstations and servers. Later an RM Nimbus AX or VX became the usual choice of fileserver. PC-186 workstations could be designated as print servers, allowing shared access to printers from all workstations.

The network used Microsoft MS-Net server and client software, Zilog Z-Net network interface cards, coaxial cable and BNC connectors. It allowed up to 127 workstations to be connected and booted directly from the network server.

Network users could be members of user groups, with each group receiving a customisable menu of programs to execute or a Windows 3.0 desktop, optionally without the 'File' menu in Program Manager.

By current standards, network security was primitive.

RM Net was superseded in the early 1990s by RM Net LM, a network operating system based on Microsoft LAN Manager. RM Net LM retained support for PC-186 workstations, allowing them to boot to MS-DOS and to start Windows 3.0.
