= Glow (Scottish Schools National Intranet) =

Scottish Schools National Intranet

Glow is the Scottish Schools National Intranet. It is a major national ICT and telecommunications programme managed by Education Scotland. The project is funded by the Scottish Government and is a collaboration between local authorities, Education Scotland and RM Education. The online portal is powered by RM Unify, a service which provides account management and the Launchpad, an interface which allows users to access applications provided by the Scottish Government, local authorities, and individual schools.

In 2023, Education Scotland renewed its contract with RM for Glow.

== Initial rollout ==
Preparation for Glow began with an investigatory phase known as Phase Zero, which involved checking that Glow could interface with the management information systems of the 32 Education Authorities in Scotland in order to provide the anticipated 800,000 accounts. Glow was then piloted over a number of stages, and at each stage further functionality was introduced and tested.

Up and running by 2009, it became the world's first national education internet.
