= Michael O'Regan (businessman) =

British businessman (born 1947)

Michael Rowan Hamilton John O'Regan OBE (born c. 1947) is a British businessman and the co-founder of RM plc.

O'Regan graduated with an economics degree from Cambridge University.

In 1973, with Mike Fischer (who had a physics degree from Oxford), O'Regan co-founded Research Machines, a British microcomputer and then software company for the educational market. He was an executive director until 1992, when he became a non-executive director. He has been a non-executive director of a number of other companies as well, including the Oxford Technology Venture Capital Trusts.

O'Regan was awarded an honorary degree by Oxford Brookes University in 1999. With RM co-founder, Mike Fischer O'Regan was awarded an honorary degree by the Open University in 2002.

O'Regan was appointed an Officer of the Order of the British Empire (OBE) in the 2000 Birthday Honours, for services to Education, Training and Economic Development in South East England. He was a governor of Oxford Brookes University and of The Oxford Academy Trust, and a Deputy Lieutenant of Oxfordshire from 2003 until 2014 when he and his wife Jane moved to Wiltshire.

O'Regan is the founder and Chair of Hamilton Trust which ran Maths Year 2000 for the British government, and co-founded early years charity Peeple.
