= Boorman =

Boorman is a surname. Notable people with the surname include:

- Aimee Boorman (born 1973), American artistic gymnastics coach
- Arthur Boorman (born 1956), American professional wrestler, fitness instructor and actor
- Charley Boorman (born 1966), English actor, adventurer and travel writer
- Derek Boorman (1930–2025), British Army officer and Chief of Defence Intelligence
- Emma Boorman, British nineteenth-century artist who specialised in woodcuts
- Imogen Boorman (born 1971), English actress
- James Boorman Colgate (1818–1904), American financier
- John Boorman (born 1933), English filmmaker
- John Boorman (cricketer) (c. 1755–1807), English cricketer
- Katrine Boorman (born 1960), English actress and director of film
- Reg Boorman (1935–2016), New Zealand politician
- Scott Boorman (born 1949), American mathematical sociologist

== See also ==
- James Boorman Colgate, American financier
- Borman
- Bormann
