= Bormann =

Bormann is a German surname. Notable people with the surname include:

- Albert Bormann (1902–1989), German Nazi Party official, adjutant to Adolf Hitler
- Cheryl Bormann (fl. 2008), American attorney
- Edwin Bormann (1851–1912), German writer
- Elisabeth Bormann (1895–1986), Austrian physicist
- Emma Bormann (1887–1974), Austrian artist
- Ernest Bormann (1925–2008), American academic in speech-communication
- Ernst Bormann (1897–1960), German World War I flying ace and World War II Luftwaffe general
- Eugen Bormann (1842–1917), German-Austrian historian
- F. Herbert Bormann (1922–2012), American plant ecologist
- John Bormann (born 1993), American baseball player
- Johanna Bormann, also Juana Bormann (1893–1945), German SS Nazi concentration camp prison guard executed for war crimes
- Karin Bormann (born 1954), German Olympic swimmer
- Karl Bormann (1928–2015), German philosopher
- Maria Benedita Bormann (1853–1935), Brazilian writer
- Martin Bormann (1900–1945), German Nazi Party official, Adolf Hitler's private secretary
- Martin Adolf Bormann (1930–2013), German theologian and Roman Catholic priest, son of Martin Bormann
- Sarah Bormann (born 1990), German boxer

== See also ==
- Borman
- Boorman
