= Geoffrey D. Borman =

American quantitative methodologist

Geoffrey D. Borman is an American education researcher, quantitative methodologist and policy analyst. He is currently the Alice Wiley Snell Endowed Professor at Arizona State University, and co-editor-in-chief of Educational Evaluation and Policy Analysis. His research focuses on educational inequality, federal education policy, randomized field experiments, literacy interventions, social-psychological interventions, and evidence-based education policy.

== Early life and education ==
Borman received a Bachelor of Arts in psychology from the University of Cincinnati in 1988. He earned a Ph.D. from the University of Chicago in 1997 through the Department of Education’s Measurement, Evaluation, and Statistical Analysis (MESA) program.

== Career ==
Borman began his career at Abt Associates, where he worked in research and evaluation from 1990 to 1995. He later served as a research associate at the University of Chicago and as associate research scientist at Johns Hopkins University’s Center for Social Organization of Schools and Center for Research on the Education of Students Placed at Risk.

In 2001, he joined the University of Wisconsin–Madison faculty, where he was later named Vilas Distinguished Achievement Professor. He directed the federally funded Interdisciplinary Training Program in the Education Sciences from 2013 to 2020. Since 2021, he has been the Alice Wiley Snell Endowed Professor at Arizona State University.

He has also served as president of Measured Decisions, Inc., an education research and consulting firm.

== Research ==
Borman's main research interests revolve around social stratification and the ways in which educational policies and practices can help address and overcome inequality. His methodological work has emphasized meta-analysis, quasi-experimental and experimental research designs, and multilevel modelling.

He has led or co-led more than 25 major randomized controlled trials funded by the U.S. Department of Education and private foundations. An early example was the national randomized field trial of Success for All, a comprehensive school reform model for high-poverty elementary schools. As one of the field’s earliest school-level cluster-randomized trials, the study was recognized by U.S. Department of Education leadership as a “sophisticated study that uses everything the evaluation field has come to recognize as high-quality,” while the same article credited it with helping establish “a new generation of large-scale experiments that use randomized research designs to give educators and policymakers clearer answers on what works in schools”.

Borman's scholarship has further contributed to understanding how federal education programs have reduced persistent achievement gaps in American society. His 2001 book, Title I: Compensatory Education at the Crossroads (Borman, Stringfield, & Slavin, 2001), discussed the history, student achievement effects, and future of the federal government's largest investment in elementary and secondary education: Title I of the Elementary and Secondary Education Act of 1965 (most recently reauthorized as the Every Student Succeeds Act). His article, “Title I and student achievement: A meta-analysis of federal evaluation results," was an influential early synthesis of federal evaluation evidence that documented modest positive effects on student achievement and helped reframe debates over the effectiveness of federal investments in education for economically disadvantaged students.

His later reanalysis of Coleman’s Equality of Educational Opportunity data challenged the longstanding interpretation that schools contribute little to student outcomes, showing instead that school contexts and between-school differences can play a meaningful role in shaping educational inequality.

Finally, other recent research on social-psychological interventions, including values affirmation, adversity reappraisal, and identity-based belonging interventions, demonstrated that brief, theoretically precise interventions can be deployed at scale to improve students’ academic achievement, behavior, and well-being, while reducing persistent racial and ethnic inequities, including narrowing national achievement gaps and the Black–White suspension gap.

== Awards and honors ==
Borman has been the recipient of a number of national awards, including a 2002 National Academy of Education/Spencer Postdoctoral Fellowship Award, the 2004 Raymond Catell Early Career Award from the American Educational Research Association, the 2004 AERA Review of Research Award, the 2008 AERA Palmer O. Johnson Award. He has been selected by Education Week as one of the top 200 scholars for influencing U.S. education practice and policy. In 2009, his contributions to the field of education research were recognized by his nomination and selection as a Fellow of the AERA. In 2015, he was awarded the Vilas Distinguished Achievement Professorship from the University of Wisconsin-Madison, in 2020, the Foundation Professorship from Arizona State University, and in 2021, the Alice Wiley Snell Endowed Professorship.

== Selected bibliography ==
=== Books ===
- Borman, G. D., & Boulay, M. (Eds.). (2004). Summer learning: Research, policies, and programs. Erlbaum.
- Borman, G. D., Stringfield, S. C., & Slavin, R. E. (Eds.). (2001). Title I: Compensatory education at the crossroads. Erlbaum

=== Articles ===
- Borman, G. D., & Yang, H. (2026). "Cumulative access to print books improves literacy achievement: Evidence from a five-year randomized trial in high-poverty schools." Proceedings of the National Academy of Sciences, 123, e2521416123.
- Borman, G. D., Pyne, J., Rozek, C. S., & Schmidt, A. J. (2022). "A replicable identity-based intervention reduces the Black-white suspension gap at scale." American Educational Research Journal, 59, 284–314.
- Borman, G. D., Rozek, C., Pyne, J., & Hanselman, P. (2019). "Reappraising academic and social adversity improves middle-school students’ academic achievement, behavior, and well-being." Proceedings of the National Academy of Sciences, 116, 16286–16291.
- Borman, G. D. (2017). "Advancing values affirmation as a scalable strategy for mitigating identity threats and narrowing national achievement gaps." Proceedings of the National Academy of Sciences, 114, 7486–7488.
- Borman, Geoffrey D.; Dowling, Maritza (May 2010). "Schools and Inequality: A Multilevel Analysis of Coleman's Equality of Educational Opportunity Data". Teachers College Record: The Voice of Scholarship in Education. 112 (5): 1201–1246. doi:10.1177/016146811011200507. ISSN 0161-4681.
- Borman, Geoffrey D.; Dowling, N. Maritza (September 2008). "Teacher Attrition and Retention: A Meta-Analytic and Narrative Review of the Research". Review of Educational Research. 78 (3): 367–409. doi:10.3102/0034654308321455. ISSN 0034-6543.
- Borman, G. D., Slavin, R. E., Cheung, A., Chamberlain, A., Madden, N., & Chambers, B. (2007). "Final reading outcomes of the national randomized field trial of Success for All." American Educational Research Journal, 44(3), 701–731.
- Borman, G. D., Hewes, G. M., Overman, L. T., & Brown, S. (2003). "Comprehensive school reform and achievement: A meta-analysis." Review of Educational Research, 73(2), 125–230.
- Borman, G. D., & D'Agostino, J. V. (1996). "Title I and student achievement: A meta-analysis of federal evaluation results." Educational Evaluation and Policy Analysis, 18, 309–326.
