= Gloria Borman =

South African retired politician

Member of the National Assembly of South Africa
- In office 6 May 2009 – 6 May 2014
- In office 1999–2004

Personal details
- Party: African National Congress (2004–present)
- Other party: Democratic Party/Democratic Alliance (before 2004)
- Spouse: Rev. John Borman
- Profession: Politician

Gloria Mary Borman is a South African retired politician who served as a Member of the National Assembly of South Africa for two nonconsecutive terms from 1999 until 2004 and again from 2009 to 2014. She represented the Democratic Party which later became the Democratic Alliance during her first term in Parliament and represented the African National Congress during her second and final term.

== Political career ==
Borman was elected to the National Assembly of South Africa in the 1999 general election as a member of the Democratic Party which later became the Democratic Alliance. During her first term in parliament, she sat on the Provincial and Local Portfolio Committee, the Social Development Portfolio Committee and the Public Enterprises Portfolio Committee. Borman left parliament at the 2004 general election.

The following year, Borman joined the African National Congress. She subsequently stood in a municipal by-election as the ANC candidate and won the ward from the DA. She served as a ward councillor from 2006 to 2009.

In the 2009 general election, Borman was elected to an ANC seat in the National Assembly. She was appointed a member of the Portfolio Committee on Human Settlements. She was one of two ANC MPs who abstained from voting for the Protection of State Information Bill in 2011 even after the party issued a three-line whip. She reasoned in an interview with the Cape Argus that the bill would hinder the fight against government corruption.

Borman unsuccessfully stood for re-election in the 2014 general election, having been ranked low on the ANC's provincial-to-national list.

== Personal life ==
Borman lives in Westville, KwaZulu-Natal. By 2019, she had been married to her husband, Reverend John Borman, for 50 years.
