= Pip Borrman =

Australian aerobatics pilot (1954–2009)

Peter Borrman
- Born: 27 July 1954
- Died: 25 February 2009 (aged 54); Shepparton, Australia
- Other names: Pip
- Occupation: Aerobatics pilot
- Spouse: Janet Borrman
- Website: http://www.edgeaerobatics.com.au

Peter "Pip" Borrman was an accomplished Australian aerobatics pilot. He was killed in a training accident in Shepparton, Victoria, on 25 February 2009.
