= Elisabeth Bormann =

Austrian physicist

- Born: May 12, 1895; Döbling
- Died: August , 1986; Berlin-Charlottenburg
- Education: University of Vienna
- Scientific career
- Workplaces: Institut für Theoretische Physik; Siemens-Schuckert
- Thesis: Zur experimentellen Methodik der Zerfallsschwankungen (1919)

Elisabeth Ottilie Marianne Bormann (May 12, 1895 – August 1986) was an Austrian physicist and assistant to Max Born. She was involved in measuring the free path of atoms in gases and the size of molecules.

== Early life and education ==
Bormann was born in Döbling, Austria. She attended elementary and community school in Klosterneuburg. As a child, Bormann was enthusiastic about gymnastics and piano. Bormann was part of the advanced training programme offered by Eugenie Schwarzwald, and finished high school at the Wasagasse grammar school (then KK Staatsgymnasium). After completing her high school training, she enrolled in an undergraduate course in mathematics and the University of Vienna. She remained there for her doctoral research, during which she studied decay fluctuations and was awarded a distinction. Her PhD examiners were Franz S. Exner and Gustav Jäger.

== Research and career ==
Born and Bormann experiment

In 1919 Bormann joined the Institut für Theoretische Physik, where she worked as an assistant to Max Born. In this capacity, she developed the first atomic beams. Working with Born in 1920, Bormann was the first to measure the free path of atoms in gases and the size of molecules. She also worked with Friedrich Dessauer on the development of X-ray based technologies.

Bormann started her independent scientific career at the Siemens-Schuckert, where she studied cable technology. She became a German citizen in 1957. Bormann was involved with the supervision of various physicists, including Wilhelm Heinrich Heraeus.

== Legacy ==
In 2019 a plaque was unveiled to record Born and Bormann's discoveries. It will be attached to the former physics building in Robert-Mayer-Straße 2.

== Select publications ==
- Born, Max; Bormann, Elisabeth (1920). "Zur Gittertheorie der Zinkblende". Annalen der Physik. 367 (11): 218–246. Bibcode:1920AnP...367..218B. doi:10.1002/andp.19203671103. ISSN 0003-3804.
- Bormann, Elisabeth (1920). "Das elektrostatische Potential des Flußspatgitters". Zeitschrift für Physik. 1 (1): 55–56. Bibcode:1920ZPhy....1...55B. doi:10.1007/bf01881026. ISSN 1434-6001. S2CID 123021240.
- Born, Max; Bormann, Elisabeth (1920-06-01). "Die Elektronenaffinität des Schwefelatoms". Zeitschrift für Physik (in German). 1 (3): 250–255. Bibcode:1920ZPhy....1..250B. doi:10.1007/BF01329169. ISSN 0044-3328. S2CID 121149304.
