= RM plc =

British organization

- Formerly: Research Machines (Holdings) Limited (1983–1984); Research Machines PLC (1984–1994)
- Type: Public
- Traded as: LSE: RM.
- Industry: Education Technology (EdTech): • Classroom resources and consumables; • Computer hardware and network infrastructure; • Computer software; • Exam authoring, e-marking and exam data; • Internet provision (ISP); • IT services
- Founded: 1973
- Founder: Mike Fischer; Mike O'Regan
- Headquarters: Milton Park, Oxfordshire, UK
- Area served: Worldwide
- Key people: • Helen Stevenson (Non-Executive Chair); • Mark Cook (CEO); • Simon Goodwin (CFO)
- Products: • Bee-Bot; • RM Assessor; • RM Broadband; • RM Compare; • RM NXT Generation Services; • Oti-Bot; • RM SafetyNet; • RM StudyKIT; • RM Unify; • RM Voice; • Educational reseller of third-party hardware, software and classroom resources
- Revenue: ▼£166.1 million (2024)
- Net income: ▲£(4.7) million (2024)
- Number of employees: ▼FTE 1,644 (2024)
- Divisions: • RM Technology; • RM Assessment; • RM Educational Resources (trading as TTS)
- Subsidiaries: • RM Education Limited (RM Technology and RM Assessment); • RM Educational Resources Limited (TTS); • RM India (RM Education Solutions India Pvt Limited); • SONET Systems Pty Limited (RM Assessment); • RM PLC Australia Pty Limited (RM Assessment)
- Website: www.rm.com

RM plc is a British company that specialises in providing information technology products and services to educational organisations and establishments. Its key market is UK education including schools, colleges, universities, government education departments and educational agencies.

The company was founded in 1973 as Research Machines Limited. As of 2016, RM plc employs around 1,700 people, the majority based in the company's headquarters located on Milton Park, near Didcot, Oxfordshire. RM also has offices across the United Kingdom (Cheshire, Nottinghamshire, Lanarkshire and London) and a software development facility in India.

== History ==
Logo used from the early 1990s until 2010

The company was founded in 1973 as Research Machines Limited in Oxford, England, by Mike Fischer and Mike O'Regan, respectively graduates of Oxford and Cambridge Universities. Initially it traded under the name Sintel as a mail-order supplier of electronic components, mainly dealing with the hobbyist market.

With the arrival of microprocessors in the mid-1970s, the company expanded into the design and manufacturing of microcomputers. The company shipped its first computer in 1977 to a customer in a Local Education Authority and has been involved with educational computing ever since.

In the 1980s RM and its rival Acorn Computers sold thousands of computers to schools in the UK as part of the government's Microelectronics Education Programme. A key model of the time was RM's Z80-based RML 380Z.

The company was invited to tender to supply the BBC micro but declined on grounds that it was not economically feasible to provide so many features at such a low price and to such a tight schedule.

The company floated on the London Stock Exchange in November 1994 under the name RM plc.

Mark Cook joined the Group as chief executive officer in January 2023. Previous CEOs were: Mike Fischer (until 1997), Richard Girling (1997–2002), Tim Pearson (2002–2008), Terry Sweeney (2008–2011), Rob Sirs (2011–2012), Martyn Ratcliffe (2011–2013), David Brooks (2013–2021), and Neil Martin (2021–2023).

In 2003 the company won the contract to deliver online tests for Key Stage 3 ICT. Despite a pilot phase in 2005 involving 45,500 pupils that was judged a success by the Qualifications and Curriculum Authority the government cancelled the contract in 2007, shortly before their scheduled introduction.

Cuts in the budgets of UK educational establishments in 2011 damaged RM's revenues, leading it to shed hundreds of employees and sell less profitable parts of its business.

RM ceased production of computers towards the end of 2013.

== Business structures ==
RM classifies its business into three areas:

=== RM Technology ===
The division that deals with technology infrastructure, software and services – including interactive classroom equipment, connectivity, networking software, school management software and support services.

=== RM Educational Resources ===
This division focuses on products for use in the learning curriculum, trading as TTS, a company acquired in 2004. TTS supply educational resources from a number of third-party partners as well as having developed over 5,000 of their own resources – one of the best known and best selling being the Bee-Bot® programmable robot, designed to introduce learners to programming concepts.

RM previously offered products from other classroom resources firms it had acquired:

- SpaceKraft Ltd – developer and manufacturer of a range of sensory products. Acquired in 2007, sold back to original owners in 2016.
- DACTA Ltd – distributor of educational products from LEGO, TOLO and BRIO. Acquired in 2007 and sold in 2012.
- ISIS Concepts Ltd – a UK furniture manufacturer. Acquired in 2009 and sold in 2012.
- Consortium – a stationery and supplies company, was acquired for £56 million in 2018. Despite substantial investment including a shared distribution facility with TTS and the launch of a new ecommerce website, ultimately the acquisition proved to not be profitable and ceased trading at the end of 2023.

=== RM Assessment ===
Deals with the process management and outsourcing for testing and qualifications; data analysis services for teachers, education managers and policy makers. Clients include Cambridge Assessment and the International Baccalaureate.

== International operations ==
From the mid-1990s the company expanded overseas, with international revenues rising to 12% of the total group's revenue in 2009. A contraction in customer spending in RM's core UK education market and slow growth in the overseas businesses prompted it to divest several of them from 2010.

=== India ===
RM founded its subsidiary RM Education Solutions India in Thiruvananthapuram in 2003 to develop software and provide central corporate functions. In November 2016 it accounted for approximately 36% of the RM Group workforce.

=== Germany ===
In 1993 the company established a subsidiary in Soest, Germany, in order to sell a localized version of RM Net LM, a turnkey Local Area Network product for schools, consisting of file-servers running Microsoft LAN Manager, client PCs running Microsoft Windows 3.1 and including a suite of RM-developed network management applications. Despite a nationwide program of marketing seminars and three pilot sites, RM withdrew within two years.

=== United States ===
RM Educational Software, Inc. was established in 2005 to provide schools and districts in North America with many of the UK software products. It has been inactive since 2011.

In 2008 RM purchased and integrated the US interactive classroom provider Computrac and sold it at a loss in 2011.

=== Asia-Pacific ===
RM Asia-Pacific started operations in 1997. A head office was opened in Perth, Australia in February 1999 after being awarded a contract for schools information systems by the Education Department of Western Australia.

The company grew to employ 50 staff located in Perth, Melbourne, Sydney and Wellington (NZ), servicing over 4,000 schools across Australasia and in Hong Kong, Beijing, Shanghai, Singapore and Taipei.

RM Asia-Pacific was sold to Civica in 2011.

=== Middle East, North Africa and South Asia (MENASA) ===
In 2009 the company announced that it was expanding its business into the MENASA region with offices based in Dubai. The company stated that this would be a joint venture:

"RM MENASA will, through subsidiaries licensed to trade in each country, provide educational ICT products and services to schools in the Middle East, North Africa and South Asia (MENASA). It will be the exclusive distributor of RM's learning technologies products in the MENASA region."

This venture was closed down after 12 months.

== RM computers ==
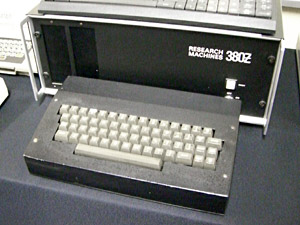
RM's first computer was the RML 380Z

RM manufactured desktop and server computers in its Oxfordshire premises from 1978 until 2014.

The first model that RM shipped was the RML 380Z, based on the Z80 processor and CP/M operating system. This was followed in 1982 by the Link 480Z, essentially a smaller, diskless 380Z with a simple networking capability, enabling it to use the file storage of a 'parent' 380Z via CP/NET networking software and Zilog Z-Net network hardware.

In 1985 RM released the RM Nimbus PC-186, a desktop computer using the Intel 80186 processor, a development of the 8088 processor used in the IBM PC and IBM PC/XT that defined 'PC compatibility' as a dominant standard for personal computers for decades to come. As the 80186 processor integrated some hardware that was incompatible with the support chips chosen by IBM for the IBM PC, RM's computer was not truly PC compatible but could run some PC software and Microsoft Windows up to 3.0.

RM introduced its AX model in 1986, using the Intel 80286 processor. A common use for the AX was as a fileserver, connected to PC-186 clients using MS-Net, Microsoft's network operating system of the time. This initially used network hardware based on Zilog Z-Net and later via Ethernet. PC-186 clients could be configured to boot via the network, which made disk drives in the client optional. Diskless client computers that loaded their operating system, applications and user data centrally from fileservers were common in UK education for a further decade, partially to avoid the cost of local storage devices such as hard disks, but also to protect system files, as the client Operating Systems MS-DOS and Windows did not offer access control at the file system level until Windows XP introduced support for NTFS.

From the AX model onwards RM computers were PC compatible. The 'X Series' was supplemented by the VX, using the new, 32-bit 80386 processor, marketed as a standalone CAD workstation or network fileserver. RM released M Series computers, primarily used as diskless network clients, using the 80286 and later 80386 processors. These used the Micro Channel architecture that featured in the IBM PS/2, which was faster than the standard ISA architecture, but failed to gain widespread acceptance. RM's fileserver platform became its 'E Series' computers, using the similarly short-lived EISA architecture and using a tower case to allow space for multiple hard disks. These fileservers ran Microsoft LAN Manager (on Microsoft OS/2) preconfigured with client Operating System files (Windows 3.0 and later 3.1) for remote booting and bundled with RM-developed tools for managing network users, client PCs and applications. This was sold as RM Net LM.

The success of PC compatibility as a worldwide standard changed RM's focus from complete in-house design of circuit boards, peripherals and firmware to the assembly and integration of hardware components sourced predominantly from the Far East. The hardware within RM server and desktop PCs was no longer significantly different from mainstream PCs from other vendors.

In the mid-90s RM released the Window Box system which used Windows 95, as well as RM Connect, for education and as a successor to RM Net LM. RM Connect comprised Microsoft operating systems at the server (Windows NT and successors) and client (Windows 3.11, Windows 95 and successors), in-house coded tools for managing the network, a predefined software configuration and applications such as Microsoft Office. Diskless network client PCs were discontinued as the client operating system from Windows 95 onwards had become too large to transfer over the LAN to multiple PCs in a timely manner, so local hard disks were required. From version 2.4 RM Connect was renamed RM Community Connect.

In the new millennium RM offered laptops and tablets that bore its name. These were manufactured by Asus and others.

In 2013 RM ceased hardware manufacture to focus on software and services.

== Software ==
The company offered a range of educational software including the Kaleidos Virtual learning environment, MathsAlive, DiscoverAlive, Living Library and SuccessMaker, as well as an e-book library management system, RM Books, developed for the education market. They also package software titles from other companies to allow easy centralized installation on RM networks. In 2005 RM was awarded the contract for Glow (formally known as Scottish Schools Digital Network (SSDN) National Intranet project). Under the five-year, £37.5 million project, all 32 Local Authorities, over 3,000 schools and over 800,000 education users plus parents had access to Glow.

RM Education's proprietary software offerings are focused on cloud delivery – including RM Unify (IdP and SSO), RM Integris (School MIS), RM Finance, and RM Easimaths.

== Staff ==
- Chief Executive Officer: Mark Cook
- Chief Financial Officer: Simon Goodwin
- Non-Executive Chairman: Helen Stevenson
