= Success for All =

Curriculum in the United States

Success for All (SFA) are standards-based Comprehensive School Reform curricula for early childhood through middle school, produced by the nonprofit organization Success for All Foundation (SFAF) of Baltimore, Maryland, US. Psychologist Robert Slavin of Johns Hopkins University founded SFAF along with his wife and research collaborator, Nancy Madden. There work is focused on private and charter schools.

== Funding ==
In 2010, Success for All received a nearly $50 million grant from the U.S. Department of Education.

Their donors on their website include Google or Alphabet, Ford, Carnegie, and Goldman Sachs. The tax filings for Success for all foundation seem to consist of charter school donations including Walmart's owners the Waltons, as well as other literacy nonprofits.

They also received $13.5 million in grants from an anonymous donor in 2025.

== Improvement strategy ==
Elements of the SFA school system include: structured teaching of reading; social and emotional development; cooperative learning and oracy; teaching at the right level and providing catch up tutoring for children who are behind.

Tutoring with the Lightning Squad is the SFA tutoring programme. The tutoring is a blended approach with in-person tutoring supported by an online tutoring platform.

== International ==
SFA has supported over 100 primary schools in the UK. In 2019 the SFA school Applegarth was ranked 6th best school in the UK by the Times newspaper.

== Criticism ==
The Success for All program was critiqued in Jonathan Kozol's book The Shame of the Nation as excessively dogmatic, utilitarian, and authoritarian. The Success for All program was also criticized in Kenneth Saltman's book The Edison Schools for undermining teacher autonomy, misrepresenting history and culture, and promoting a politicized conservative curriculum agenda under the guise of disinterested objectivity.

== See also ==
- Robert Slavin
- Mike Fischer
