= Beekman V. Hoffman =

Beekman Verplanck Hoffman (born in Poughkeepsie, New York, 28 November 1789; died in Jamaica, New York, 10 December 1834) was a United States Navy officer.

== Biography ==
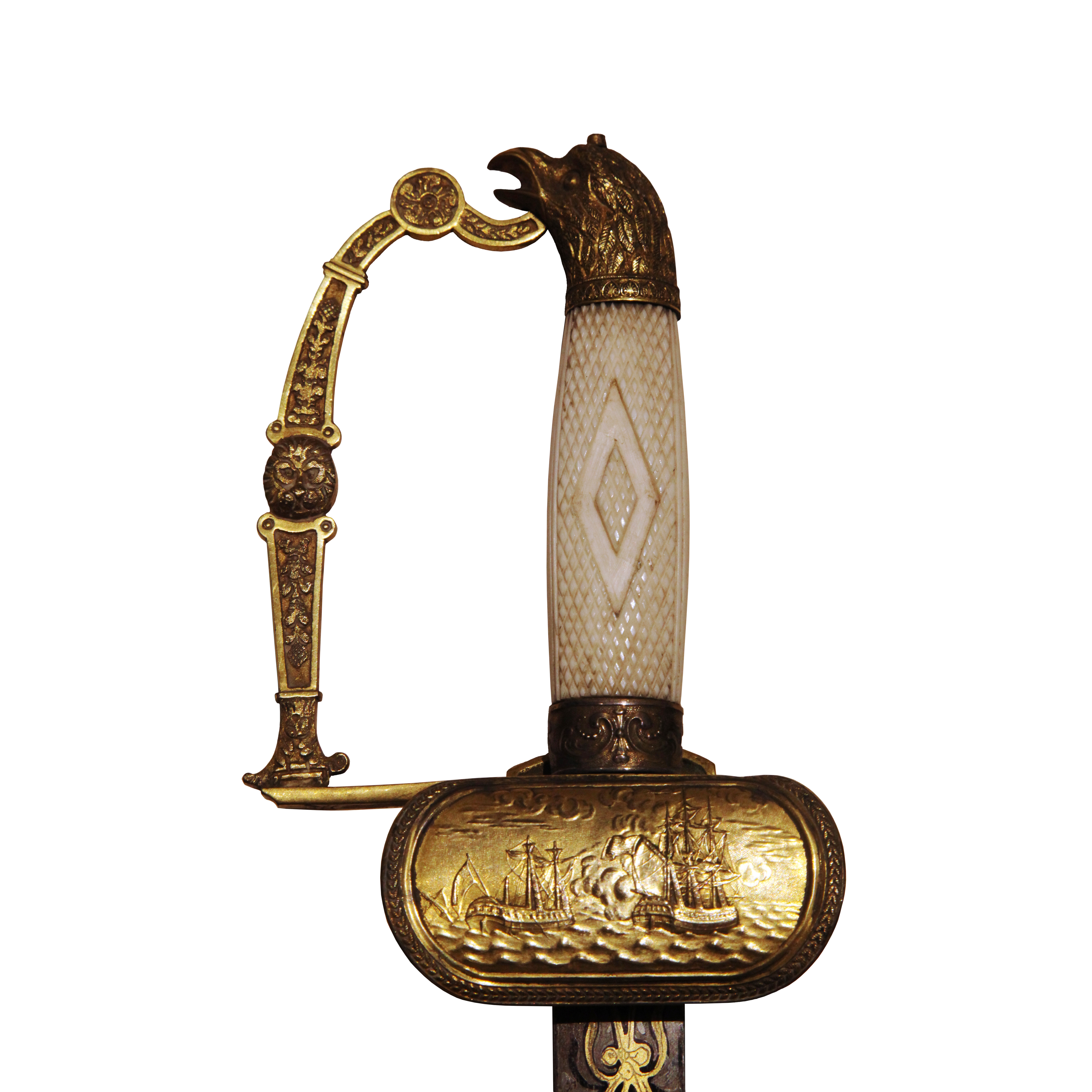
Sword presented by the State of New York to Hoffman, inscribed "in testimony of his valor, when assisting in the capture of the British frigate Guerriere, on the ever memorable 19th day of August 1812."

He entered the Navy as midshipman on 4 July 1805, was commissioned lieutenant on 21 May 1812, and commander on 5 March 1817, and reached the grade of captain on 7 March 1829. He served first in the Argus under Captain Trippe, and was attached later to the frigate Constitution, and participated in all her battles. He was present at the victory over the English ship HMS Guerriere on 19 August 1812, at that over the Java on 29 December 1812, and at the combat with the Cyane and Levant off Madeira on 20 February 1815, and carried the Cyane into New York.

In 1826 he was the first commanding officer of the sloop of war USS Boston.
