= Charles Boarman Harris =

American physician

Charles B. Harris
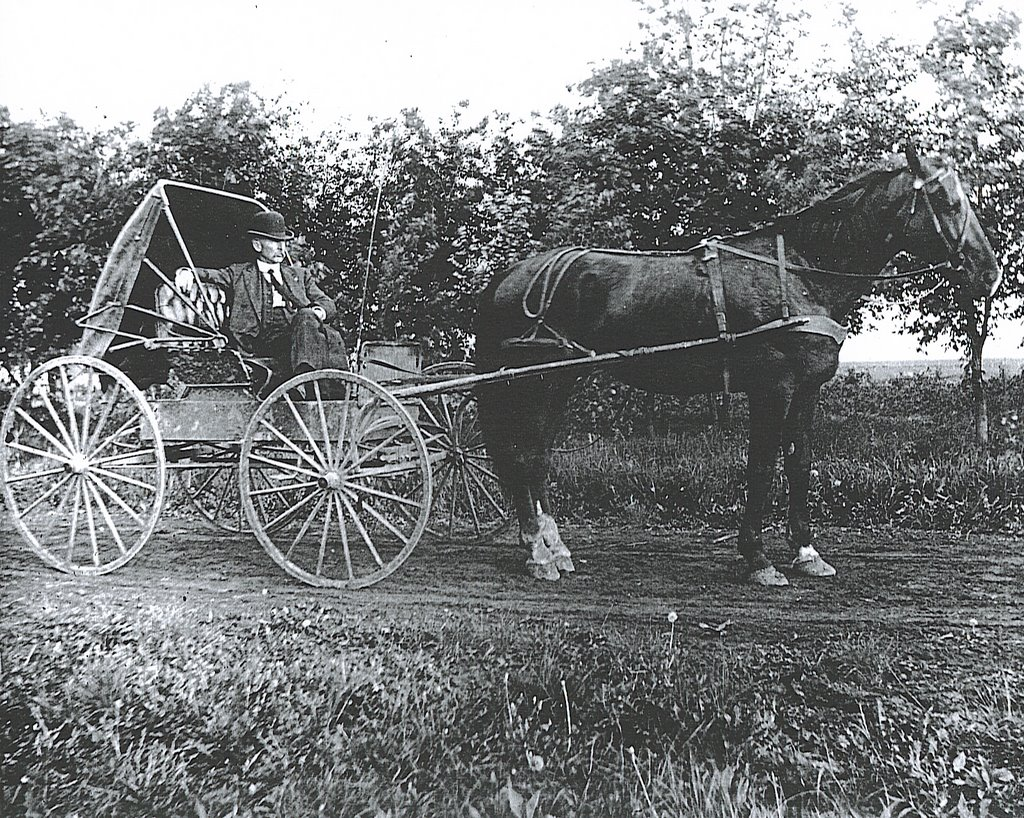
- Dr. Charles B. Harris driving a buggy in the Pembina countryside.
- Born: Charles Boarman Harris; November 6, 1857; Charles Town, Virginia, United States
- Died: January 2, 1942 (aged 84); Pembina, North Dakota, US
- Education: College of Physicians and Surgeons
- Occupations: Bank president, landowner, physician and surgeon
- Years active: 1880–1942
- Known for: Frontier doctor who helped found Pembina, North Dakota; first physician in Pembina County and longest serving in the state of North Dakota
- Political party: Democrat
- Spouse: Catherine Jane Abrams (m. 1886–1942)
- Children: 11
- Relatives: Charles Boarman (grandfather); Charles Boarman (uncle)

Charles Boarman Harris (November 6, 1857 – January 2, 1942) was an American medical doctor and surgeon. The grandson of Rear Admiral Charles Boarman, he was among the original settlers in Pembina, the first settlement in the Dakota Territory. Harris was the first doctor to serve the general population in Pembina County, and to be medically licensed, serving as the county physician for nearly 60 years. At the time of his death in 1942, he was the longest serving physician and surgeon in the state of North Dakota.

== Early life and career ==
Charles Boarman Harris was born in Charles Town, Virginia on November 6, 1857. He was the son of Susan Martha (née Boarman; 1830–1921), the daughter of Rear Admiral Charles Boarman, and Jeremiah Harris (1819–1881), a wealthy landowner and merchant. His maternal uncle, Dr. Charles Boarman (1828–1880), headed to California in the early 1850s and helped settle Amador County. Rear Admiral Boarman, a veteran of the War of 1812 and Mexican–American War, played a role in the secession of West Virginia from Virginia proper in 1861. Charles Harris' father, however, enlisted in the Confederate Army and served as a member of Ashby's Cavalry during the American Civil War.

Harris grew up on a farm near the Bloomery region in Jefferson County. He was later educated in Charles Town, West Virginia, and then Baltimore, Maryland, where he studied medicine at the College of Physicians and Surgeons. Harris graduated from the institution on March 3, 1880, and spent the next eighteen months practicing medicine in Martinsburg, West Virginia.

== Arrival in Pembina ==
After the death of his father in 1881, Harris moved to the Dakota Territory and was joined by his widowed mother and siblings the following year. On January 11, 1883, he arrived in present-day Pembina, North Dakota after a four-day journey "alone with only clothes and medical instruments". He stayed with another medical doctor at Fort Pembina for the first year. The fort's medical doctor provided medical care for the soldiers and its residents, however, there was no medical doctor serving the 4,000 settlers living in Pembina-St. Vincent area at that time. He eventually set up his own practice and became the first doctor in the county.

It was in Pembina that Harris met his future wife Catherine Jane Abrams, the daughter of Canadian-born land agent George Abrams, who was then working as register of deeds at the town courthouse. The two were married on September 29, 1886, and had eleven children together. Their first five children died with only five girls and one boy surviving into adulthood: Gladys, Kathryn J., Pauline, Janette, George, and Mary Margaret Harris.

== Frontier doctor ==
Boarman built his first home out of lumber and lived rough with his only luxuries being a coal stove and hurricane lamps he ordered through the local general store. As a young doctor traveling the countryside he faced many obstacles including severe weather conditions such as floods and thunderstorms, and especially the harsh winters of the Upper Midwest, as well as poor roads and no telegraph system. Harris made countless house calls and delivered over 3,000 babies in his near 60-year career.

A member of the Grand Forks District Medical Society and the North Dakota State Medical Society, Harris was well-read on medical and scientific research and had "comprehensive knowledge of the science of medicine". In 1888, he was appointed Pembina Health Officer and remained in this position for nearly five decades; he also spent thirty years as a county medical commissioner examining cases of insanity.

== Later years ==
By the late-1890s, Harris had taken on other interests in addition to medicine. Starting in 1895, he spent twenty-five years as president of the Pembina school board. He owned several farms in Pembina County, which he personally managed, and a large wheat field contributing significantly to his income. His wife, a devout Methodist, was socially active in the community starting the public parks in South Pembina and the original Masonic park. In 1905, Harris opened a doctor's office in downtown Pembina. The office itself was twelve feet wide on the southside while a drug store occupied the north end of the building. The old doctor's office exists today as part of Pembina's "Spot Bar". In 1911, Harris became president of the Merchants Bank of Pembina and held this post for over 15 years. In addition, he belonged to the Ancient Order of United Workmen, Degree of Honor, Masons, and the Yeomen.

On September 5, 1936, Charles and Catherine Harris celebrated their 50th wedding anniversary. The Saturday afternoon event was attended by hundreds of friends and family at the Harris residence. Among the family members were their children Gladys, Kathryn, Pauline, Jeanette, George, and Margaret Harris, as well as seven grandchildren Janet Holmquist, Mary Marcy Schave, Georgia, Mary and Harold Stratte, and Charles and John Wilkins. Charles Harris continued practicing medicine during his final years and was still performing his duties at 80 years old. He died at his home from a heart ailment on January 2, 1942. Harris was the oldest practicing physician in Pembina County at the time of his death.

In 2007, the ten surviving grandchildren of Charles and Catherine Harris pooled together enough money for a silver level donation to the Pembina Community Center Renovation project in their memory. The civic contributions of the Harris' were subsequently recognized by local officials.
