= Emma Boorman =

British artist

Emma Boorman was a nineteenth-century artist who specialised in woodcuts. She trained in Vienna.
