= Nancy Madden =

American psychologist

Nancy Abigail Madden is an American psychologist who studies education. She is known for the Success for All model of education. She is a professor in the School of Education at Johns Hopkins University.

== Education and career ==
Madden attended Reed College for her undergraduate degree, which she received in 1973. She went on to American University for graduate studies, where she received her PhD in 1980, with a thesis titled Effects of Cooperative Learning on the Social Acceptance of Mainstreamed Academically Handicapped Students. She has worked at Johns Hopkins University since 1980, and is a professor at the Center for Research and Reform in Education at that university.

== Success for All ==
Together with Robert Slavin, Madden developed the Success for All model of reform for elementary and middle schools beginning in 1986, after being approached by the superintendent of the Baltimore school system for help with troubled inner city schools. As of May 2005, the program was used in 1,300 schools in 47 states. A meta-analysis of school improvement programs rated it favorably. However, most teachers participating in Success For All, even ones who strongly support the program, have been found to make substantial changes in implementation in contrast to the expectations of developers. Some teachers also reported that the program constrained their creativity and autonomy in their own classroom.

== Personal life ==
Madden was married to her research collaborator Robert Slavin until his death in 2021.

== Books ==
- Slavin, Robert E.; Madden, Nancy A.; Chambers, Bette (2001). One Million Children: Success for All. Corwin Press. ISBN 978-0-8039-6803-5.
- Slavin, Robert E.; Madden, Nancy A.; Chambers, Bette; Haxby, Barbara (2008). 2 Million Children: Success for All. Corwin Press. ISBN 978-1-4522-9466-7.
