= USS Fairfield (1828) =

Sloops-of-war of the United States Navy

History

United States
- Launched: 28 June 1828
- Commissioned: 20 August 1828
- Decommissioned: 3 February 1845
- Fate: Broken up, 1852

General characteristics
- Type: Sloop-of-war
- Displacement: 700 tons
- Length: 127 ft (39 m)
- Beam: 33 ft 9 in (10.29 m)
- Draft: 16 ft 6 in (5.03 m)
- Propulsion: Sail
- Complement: 190
- Armament: 4 8", 24 24 pdr

USS Fairfield was a sloop-of-war in the United States Navy. Fairfield was launched 28 June 1828 by New York Navy Yard; and first put to sea 20 August 1828, Commander Foxhall A. Parker, Sr., in command.

Reaching Port Mahon in the Balearic Islands 25 September 1828, Fairfield cruised the Mediterranean Sea until returning to Hampton Roads 5 May 1831. Among her crewmembers was midshipman George W. Taylor, later an infantry general in the Union Army during the American Civil War.

Her second cruise, from 15 November 1831 to 23 July 1832, was in the West Indies as flagship for Commodore Jesse Elliott. During much of this time she patrolled off the coast of Mexico to protect Americans and their property during political disturbances.

On 30 May 1833 Fairfield sailed from New York for duty in the Pacific Squadron, arriving at Valparaíso, Chile, 25 September. During this cruise, she supervised the disarmament and dismantling of a group of ships belonging to an Ecuadorian revolutionary force after American mediation had ended a civil war. Fairfield sailed for Norfolk, Virginia 26 September 1835, arriving in Hampton Roads 1 December. She lay in ordinary at Norfolk until 25 April 1837, when she departed for the Brazil Station, the first 4 months of which her commanding officer Commodore Isaac Mayo was senior officer of the squadron. As a protector for American commerce and interests, she guarded against a blockade of Argentina set by French warships.

Returning to New York 1 April 1840, Fairfield was again in ordinary until 10 May 1841, when she was recommissioned. She sailed to Hampton Roads, from which she took departure 28 July for the Mediterranean, carrying Commodore Charles W. Morgan to take command of the squadron based on Port Mahon. She served as his flagship from April to July 1842 while he conducted negotiations with the Emperor of Morocco to obtain redress for the arrest and detention of the United States Consul at Tangier.

Samuel W. Downing is recorded 29 November 1844 as one of the last commanders of Fairfield serving with a crew of 16 other Marines. Ironically, Commander Downing was dismissed early in his career as a midshipman by Commodore Morgan who transferred him away from his command in 1814, calling him "disagreeable" and "useless". Captain John Cassin saw other qualities in Downing and mentored him to become a lieutenant, commander, and finally a captain in 1847.

Fairfield returned to Hampton Roads from this, her last cruise, 17 January 1845, and on 3 February 1845 was decommissioned at Norfolk. Later that year she served briefly as receiving ship, then lay at Norfolk until 1852, when she was broken up.
