= Cheryl Bormann =

Attorney from Chicago

Cheryl Bormann is an attorney from Chicago. Bormann specializes in the defense of serious criminal charges including murder where the government is seeking the death penalty. She is best known for defending Waleed bin Attash before the Guantanamo military commission which began in 2012. Bormann studied law at Loyola University Chicago. From 2008 through 2011 she headed the Capital Trial Assistance Unit at the Illinois State Appellate Defender, the state agency responsible for providing legal assistance to defendants in death penalty cases in Illinois. The abolition of the death penalty in Illinois in 2011 rendered Bormann's position redundant. She then joined the 9/11 terrorist defense team.

On May 3, 2019, she was among the passengers on a chartered flight from Guantanamo Bay to Jacksonville, FL which slid off the runway into the St. Johns River. She exited the plane via the wing and was unharmed.

In March 2022, after it was revealed she was being investigated by the Military Commissions Defense Organization for her "performance and conduct," Bormann requested to be removed as learned counsel for one of the 9/11 terrorists.
