= Johannes Borman =

Dutch painter

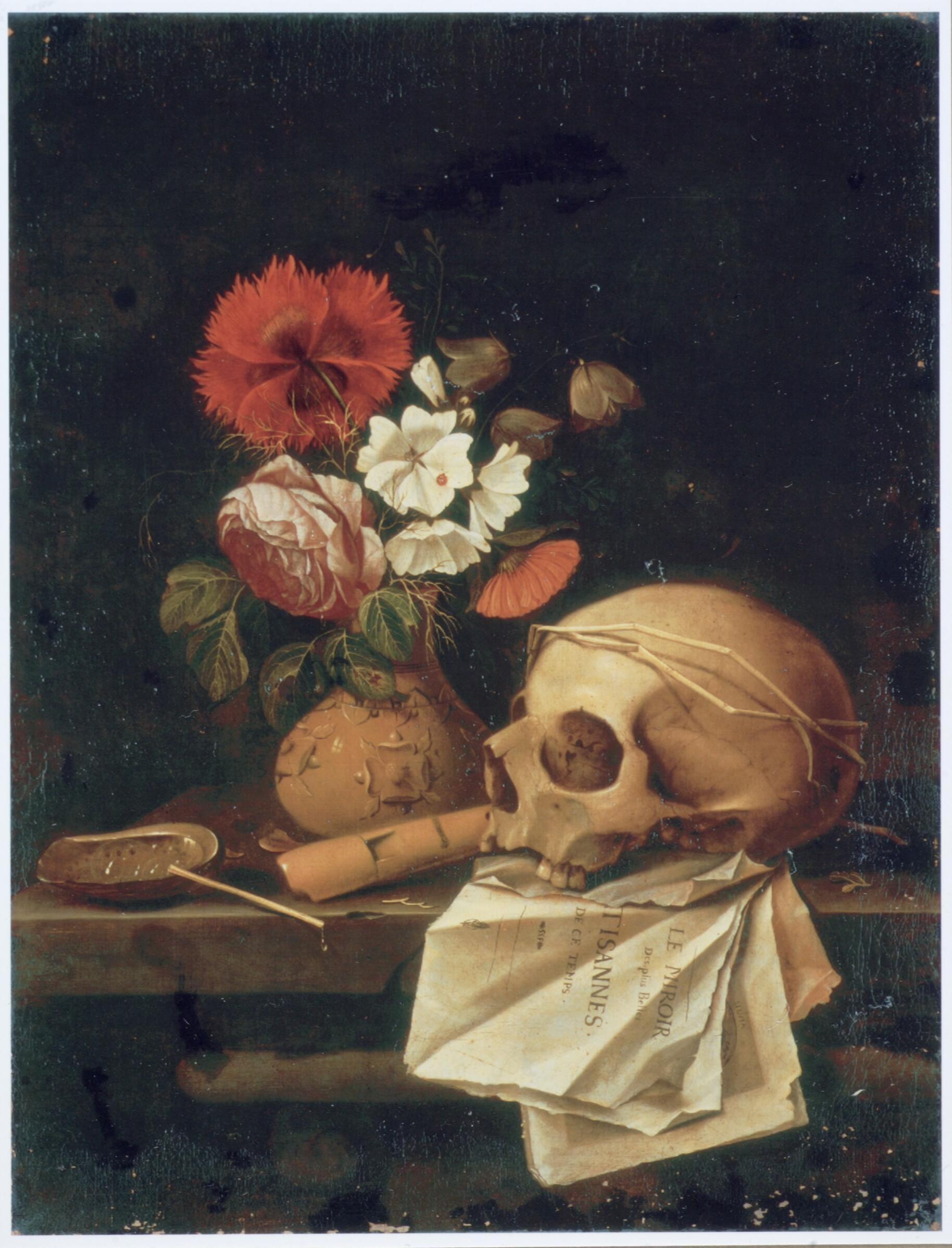
Vanitas with vase of flowers and skull on title page of 1631 book Le miroir des plus belles courtisannes de ce temps (this also had an English translation: Loocking-glass of the fairest courtiers of these tymes)

Johannes Borman (1620–1679) was a Dutch Golden Age still life painter.

== Biography ==
He was born in The Hague, and may have been related to Abraham Borman, a landscape painter from the Hague. Johannes worked in Leiden during the years 1653–1658, where he became a member of the Leiden Guild of St. Luke. In 1659 he moved to Amsterdam where he signed in as poorter, declaring that he was a painter in the Hague. He is known for fruit and flower still lifes.
