= USS Boston (1825) =

Sloops-of-war of the United States Navy

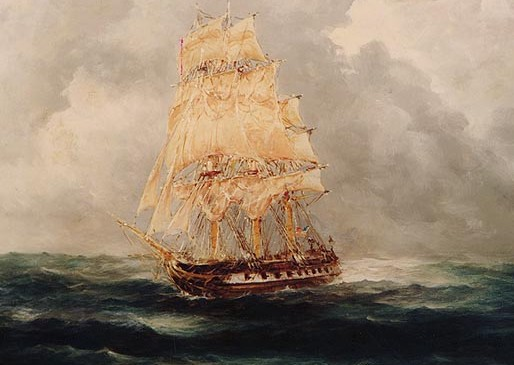
- USS Boston

History

United States
- Name: USS Boston
- Namesake: Boston, Massachusetts
- Builder: Boston Navy Yard
- Launched: 15 October 1825
- Commissioned: 1826
- Fate: Wrecked 15 November 1846

General characteristics
- Displacement: 700 long tons (710 t)
- Length: 127 ft (39 m)
- Beam: 33 ft 9 in (10.29 m)
- Draft: 16 ft (4.9 m)
- Speed: 11 kn (13 mph; 20 km/h)
- Complement: 125
- Armament: 20 × 24 pdr (11 kg) smoothbore guns

The fourth USS Boston was an 18-gun sloop of war, launched on 15 October 1825 by the Boston Navy Yard and commissioned the following year, Master Commandant Beekman V. Hoffman in command.

Boston served on the Brazil Station 1826-1829 and the Mediterranean Station 1830–1832. She was then laid up at Boston Navy Yard until joining the West Indies Squadron in 1836. Except for two short periods in ordinary at New York Navy Yard she served continuously for the next 10 years. Boston cruised on the West Indies (1836–39), East Indies (1841–43), and Brazil (1843–46) Stations, returning to the United States in 1846. She was then ordered to join Commodore Conner's Home Squadron blockading the Mexican east coast. While en route to her new station, Boston was wrecked on Eleuthera Island, Bahamas, during a squall on 15 November 1846. Although the sloop was a total loss, all hands were saved.

== See also ==
- List of sloops of war of the United States Navy
- Bibliography of early American naval history
