= Robert Slavin =

American psychologist (1950–2021)

- Born: September 17, 1950; Bethesda, Maryland, U.S.
- Died: April 24, 2021 (aged 70); Baltimore, Maryland, U.S.
- Known for: Success for All

Academic background
- Education: Reed College (BA); Johns Hopkins University (PhD)

Academic work
- Discipline: Education
- Institutions: Johns Hopkins University

Robert Edward Slavin (September 17, 1950 – April 24, 2021) was an American psychologist who studied educational and academic issues. He was known for the Success for All educational model. Until his death, he was a distinguished professor and director of the Center for Research and Reform in Education at Johns Hopkins University.

== Early life ==
Robert Edward Slavin was born in Bethesda, Maryland, on September 17, 1950. His father, Joseph G. Slavin, worked as a clinical psychologist and headed the Washington School of Psychiatry; his mother, Miriam Crohn Slavin, was a housewife. He was raised in nearby Chevy Chase, and attended Bethesda-Chevy Chase High School. He studied psychology at Reed College, obtaining a Bachelor of Arts in 1972. After teaching for a year at a school for children with disabilities, he went on to a PhD program at Johns Hopkins University, which he completed in 1975.

== Career ==
Slavin remained at Johns Hopkins as a research scientist after his PhD, and spent most of his career there; from 2004 he was a director at the Center for Research and Reform in Education at the same institution. He also held a position at York University (simultaneous with Johns Hopkins) from 2007 until 2016, where he was founding director of the Institute for Effective Education. He was appointed the first Distinguished Professor at the School of Education at Johns Hopkins in 2020.

=== Success for All ===
Together with Nancy Madden, Slavin developed the Success for All model of reform for elementary and middle schools beginning in 1986, after being approached by the superintendent of the Baltimore school system for help with troubled inner city schools. As of May 2005, the program was used in 1,300 schools in 47 states. A meta-analysis of school improvement programs rated it favorably. However, most teachers participating in Success For All, even ones who strongly support the program, have been found to make substantial changes in implementation in contrast to the expectations of developers. Some teachers also reported that the program constrained their creativity and autonomy in their own classroom.

Slavin's work includes research on classroom cooperative learning techniques including his 1980 paper "Cooperative Learning". He has written surveys of the research literature on cooperative learning.

== Awards and honors ==
Slavin was a member of the National Academy of Education since 2009. He received the E. L. Thorndike Award for Career Achievement from the American Psychological Association in 2017, and the Distinguished Contributions to Research in Education Award from the American Educational Research Association in 2019.

== Personal life ==
Slavin was married to Nancy Madden, his research partner, until his death.

Slavin died on April 24, 2021, at a hospital in Baltimore. He was 70, and suffered a heart attack prior to his death.

== Selected books ==
- Slavin, Robert E. (1995). Cooperative Learning: Theory, Research, and Practice. Allyn and Bacon. ISBN 978-0-205-15630-6.
- Slavin, Robert E.; Madden, Nancy A.; Chambers, Bette; Haxby, Barbara (2008). 2 Million Children: Success for All. Corwin Press. ISBN 978-1-4522-9466-7.
- Slavin, Robert E. (2018). Educational Psychology: Theory and Practice (12th ed.). Pearson. ISBN 978-0-13-489510-9.
