= Malaya Borman =

Indian politician

Member of Assam Legislative Assembly
- In office 2006–2011
- Preceded by: Pabindra Deka
- Succeeded by: Manoranjan Das
- Constituency: Patacharkuchi

Personal details
- Party: Indian National Congress

Dr. Malaya Borman is an Indian politician who was elected to the Assam Legislative Assembly from Patacharkuchi constituency in the 2006 Assam Legislative Assembly election as a member of the Indian National Congress.
