= USS Decoy =

History

United States
- Name: Decoy
- Acquired: 27 December 1822
- Fate: Sold, January 1826

General characteristics
- Armament: 6 guns

USS Decoy was a schooner in the United States Navy during the 1820s. Decoy was purchased 27 December 1822 by Commodore David Porter in New York under the name Zodiac.

On 16 January 1823 she sailed from New York under the command of Lieutenant Lawrence Kearny to join the West Indies Squadron. Newly organized by the Navy for the suppression of piracy in the West Indies, this force was composed of small shallow-draft ships capable of cruising close in shore and ascending rivers in carrying out their mission. Decoy was employed as a storeship carrying supplies from New York to the West Indies for this fleet until 22 December 1825, when she arrived at Norfolk Navy Yard.

Decoy was sold in January 1826.
