= Milton Park =

Business and technology park in Oxfordshire, England

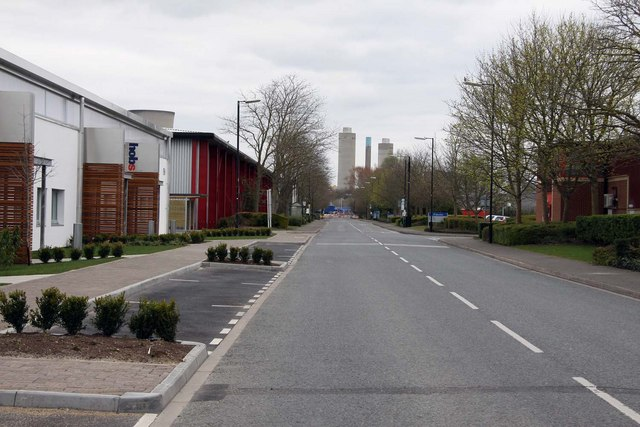
- Interactive map of Milton Park
- Type: Business park / Technology park / Science park
- Location: Near Didcot, Oxfordshire, within Science Vale, England
- Nearest city: Oxford
- Coordinates: 51.623°N 1.292°W
- Operator: MEPC
- Website: www.miltonpark.co.uk

Milton Park is the UK’s largest single ownership innovation community, situated in Vale of the White Horse in South Oxfordshire, England. The Park is located between Didcot and Abingdon in Science Vale UK, a cluster of significant growth, innovation and enterprise.

Covering nearly three million square feet of floor space across 300 acres, it comprises over 280 organisations employing thousands of people across sectors such as life sciences, energy, space and supporting technologies.

Milton Park was formerly a Ministry of Defence military depot during the First and Second World Wars, before it was auctioned in 1971 to become the Milton Trading Estate. In 1984, MEPC plc acquired Milton Park and in 1988, the management team made the decision to support science companies, startups and Oxford University spinouts. From 2013 to 2023, occupiers based at Milton Park secured 7.56% of the UK’s overall investment for life sciences.

In addition to its occupiers, Milton Park features a variety of amenities including cafés, food outlets, a gym with a swimming pool, pharmacy, Post Office, Amazon lockers, MOT centre and a day nursery.

Milton Park is held in the MEPC Milton LP joint venture partnership two long-term pension fund shareholders, Federated Hermes and CPP and is operated by MEPC Ltd, a specialist real estate development and asset operating platform within Federated Hermes.

== Location ==
Located in southern Oxfordshire, approximately 12 miles south of the city of Oxford and near the A34 dual carriageway, Milton Park is close to Didcot Parkway railway station in an area known as Science Vale UK, which also includes Culham Campus and the Harwell Science and Innovation Campus.

Milton Park is located within the Golden Triangle of Oxford, Cambridge and London, and has transport links to renowned academia, research and innovation hubs, including the University of Oxford.

== History ==
Before it was an innovation community, Milton Park’s history started as an RAF depot during the world wars.

The Royal Flying Corps established Milton as a storage depot in 1916 and during the Second World War, RAF ordnance units were built. Milton Depot supplied everything from aircraft parts and uniforms to RAF bases across the South East.

The depot remained in military use until 1963, before being auctioned in 1971 to become the Milton Trading Estate. The Estate became a distribution and storage hub and was sold to MEPC in 1985.

In 1988, the MEPC management team made the decision to support science companies, startups and Oxford University spinouts.

Biotech occupier, Oxford Asymmetry International started at Milton Park in the wartime buildings and was later bought by Evotec. Today, the drug discovery and development company is one of the Park’s largest occupiers alongside Adaptimmune and Immunocore Now Nasdaq-listed, these companies also started life as Oxford University spinout Avidex, and all three started in the war-time buildings. Milton Park’s last two remaining single-storey wartime buildings, 57 and 59 Jubilee Avenue, were demolished in 2024 to make way for future development.

== Occupiers ==
Occupiers at Milton Park cover a range of sectors, ranging from green energy start-ups to fusion energy and with a large life science cluster comprising over 800,000 sq ft of laboratories.

Major occupiers at Milton Park include but are not limited to:

- Achilles Information
- Adaptimmune
- Evotec
- Exscientia
- Immunocore
- M3 EU
- Tokamak Energy
- New England Biolabs
- Nexeon
- OBN
- Oxitec
- RM
- Taylor & Francis
- Vertex

According to a 2023 report from analytics firm Beauhurst, Milton Park companies have secured over 7% of the UK’s total life science investment, with £2.14bn of equity investment generated across 272 occupiers over the past decade.

Of these occupiers, 57 were identified as high-growth companies and 12 were spun out from academic institutions.

Milton Park has 3,400,000 sq ft (320,000 m^{2}) of business accommodation, and houses the Milton Park Innovation Centre, a flagship innovation centre for fast-growing science and technology businesses. Milton Park plans to expand to a working population of 20,000 people by 2040.

== Community ==
Milton Park supports a variety of charity and business networks, a school engagement programme, stakeholder and occupier events and onsite amenities.

=== Didcot Powerhouse Fund ===
Milton Park is a founding member and quantum donor of the Didcot Powerhouse Fund, a charity launched to tackle deprivation and inequality levels within Greater Didcot and the surrounding area.

Didcot Powerhouse Fund is administered by registered charity, Oxfordshire Community Foundation and the Fund is managed on a day-to-day basis by the Didcot Powerhouse Fund Advisory Panel.

=== Events ===
Milton Park hosts events throughout the year, including networking opportunities, sustainability talks and seasonal events.

==== King's tree planting ====
A sapling grafted from what is thought to be the world’s second oldest standing apple tree in Milton Village was planted at Milton Park by the Lord Lieutenant of Oxfordshire, Mrs Marjorie Glasgow BEM, the Chairman of Oxfordshire County Council, Felix Bloomfield and Philip Campbell from Milton Park on behalf of His Majesty, King Charles III, to commemorate his Coronation, on the day of his 75th birthday. The Milton Wonder cultivar takes its name from a local variety of tree, which dates back to 1810 in the nearby Milton Village and is nationally significant for its age, provenance and excellent fruit.

== Planning and development ==
Comprising nearly three million sq ft, Milton Park holds a Local Development Order(LDO), which is a simplified ten-day planning framework agreed as part of a partnership with the Vale of White Horse District Council. All the key planning issues are dealt with upfront so that individual projects can proceed at pace.The 2012 LDO has delivered 14 buildings (laboratory and technology space), 550,000 sq. ft of floorspace and 1,000 jobs.

Milton Park’s 2040 Vision sets out plans for how Milton Park will grow over the next 20 years, creating 10,000 new jobs across new, flexible sustainable innovation space.

A new, refreshed LDO (Local Development Order) will play a key part in supporting the 2040 vision, creating thousands of new jobs and permitting up to 4.2 million sq ft across the Park, an increase from nearly three million sq. ft.

A number of flagship and notable buildings came forward from the original 2012 LDO. These include:

=== Bee House ===
Bee House offers a variety of flexible offices, co-working and meeting rooms including a 145-seat conference facility, the Hive Café, a cycle hub, car parking with EV charging and kitchens with breakout areas.

After repurposing an existing building formerly occupied by education technology provider RM, Bee House opened its doors on World Bee Day, 20 May 2022, with a high percentage of embodied energy saved within the fabric of the building.

Milton Park’s Bee House has its own sustainable urban drainage system (SUDS) that attracts wildlife and helps prevent flooding. A water course previously screened by the parking area has been created into a wildflower meadow, designed to attract Milton Park’s resident bees.

Bee House was named the Best Commercial Development at the OxPropFest Awards 2022.

=== Innovation Centre ===
The Innovation Centre is a fully serviced office building with a variety of business space and service options for start-ups and small and medium-sized enterprises.

Almost 80 companies are currently based at the Innovation Centre, with office space ranging from 85 sq ft to 2,200 sq ft (8 – 205 sq. m).

Facilities include showers, post and call handling, a business lounge café and catering services, meeting and conference rooms and hot desk facilities.

=== 95 Park Drive ===
Evotec SE opened its new facility at 95 Park Drive at Milton Park in September 2023. The occupier has been on the Park since its acquisition of Oxford Asymmetry International PLC (“OAI”) in 2000 and is now one of Milton Park‘s largest occupiers.

95 Park Drive has been developed to accommodate new biology laboratories, collaborative workspaces and meeting rooms. The facility was designed with a particular focus on sustainability and incorporates air source heat pumps, a demand-based laboratory ventilation system, as well as low energy lighting and appliances.

== Transport ==
Milton Park has incentives and schemes in place to encourage and increase more sustainable travel for occupiers, including a low-cost bus pass, free bike and e-bike hire and a car-sharing scheme.

Results from Milton Park’s 2023 Travel Survey show that more than 50% of those that travelled to the Park in 2023 used sustainable modes such as bus, bike, and car sharing, than by single occupancy cars. Since the Covid-19 pandemic, bus usage to and from Milton Park has increased by 18%.

Milton Park is served by the following bus services all operated by Thames Travel:

X2 (Oxford-Abingdon-Milton Park-Didcot)

X32 (JR Hospital-Oxford-Milton Park-Didcot-GWP South)

X36 (Didcot-Milton Park-Grove-Wantage)

33/33A (Abingdon/GWP North-Milton Park-Didcot-Wallingford-Henley)

There is a disused siding for rail freight, connected to the Great Western Main Line and the nearest train service is to Didcot Parkway station.

=== Autonomous Vehicle Bus Trial ===
Milton Park was used as a testing location for the UK’s first fully electric autonomous (AV) bus service trials in 2023. The MultiCav ’Mi-Link’ trials featured an autonomous minibus initially on a circular route around Milton Park and then on a shuttle bus service route to Didcot Parkway train/ railway station. The trials also tested an electric single decker bus on the station route.

The consortium responsible for the trial comprised

- Centre for Transport and Society (CTS) at the University of the West of England
- Innovate UK
- First Bus
- Fusion Processing
- Government’s Centre for Connected and Autonomous Vehicles
- Milton Park
- Nova Modus
- Oxfordshire County Council
- Zipabout

The project identified a range of passenger benefits from autonomous driving technology which works in partnership with human drivers. The findings support the case for buses to be equipped with greater driver-assistance technologies, similar to the way that smaller vehicles like cars are evolving.

== Sustainability ==
=== Greener Workplace Forum ===
Milton Park’s Greener Workplace Forum launched in Spring 2021. Composed of representatives from Park occupiers, it was combined with the Sustainable Travel Forum set up in 2017 and aims to share best practice and raise awareness of existing green initiatives around energy use, recycling and transport.

=== Environmental Management ===
Milton Park holds the British Standards Institution (BSI) ISO 14001 certification for Environmental Management Systems (EMS). It has a zero-to-landfill waste policy, resulting in approximately 250 tonnes of mixed recycling being processed each year, reducing its environmental impact. Maintenance vehicles and tools on-site are electric-powered.

The Park’s maintenance team has partnered with Happy Earth Soil, a local Oxfordshire company, to collect green waste across the estate and convert it into organic compost for the park’s plants and urban garden plots. It also enforces chemical-free policy to eliminate the use of pesticides, promoting biodiversity.
