= Charles Boarman (pioneer) =

American physician

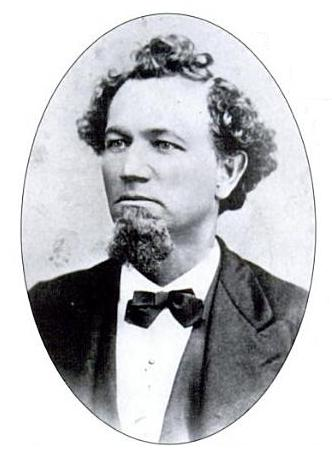
- Born: October 28, 1828; Martinsburg, Virginia, United States
- Died: November 22, 1880 (aged 52); Jackson, California
Further details
Resting place	Jackson City Cemetery
Education	Georgetown University
Occupation	Physician
Years active	1851–1880
Known for	Frontier doctor who helped settle Amador County, California; founding member of the Society of California Pioneers
Spouse	Mary Ann Hills (m. 1857–1880)
Children	7
Parent(s)	Charles Boarman and Mary Ann "Nancy" Abell
Relatives	Charles B. Harris (nephew)

Dr. Charles Boarman (October 28, 1828 – November 22, 1880) was an American pioneer and frontier medical doctor. He was among the original pioneers to settle in present-day Amador County, California, serving as its first county physician from 1863 until 1880, and was one of the founding members of the Society of California Pioneers. He was also the son of Rear Admiral Charles Boarman and uncle of fellow pioneer doctor Charles B. Harris.

== Biography ==
Charles Boarman was born in Martinsburg, Virginia on October 28, 1828. He was one of ten children born to Mary Ann "Nancy" Abell and Rear Admiral Charles Boarman (1795–1879), then a lieutenant in the United States Navy. The young Boarman earned a medical degree at Georgetown University and, shortly after graduating from St. Mary's School, he headed for California at age 23. Boarman settled in Sacramento County in 1851 and eventually married Mary Anna Hills. His wife was a member of an old New England family; her mother, Mary Morse Hills, was a descendant of Anthony Morse who arrived from Wiltshire, England, in 1635 to help found Newbury, Massachusetts. Mary Anna's cousin was Samuel Morse, the inventor of the telegraph. Charles Boarman and Mary Ann Hills had seven children together, one of whom died.

In early 1859, Boarman and his family moved to Lancha Plana, a booming mining town on the Mokelumne River, and were among the first to permanently settle in Amador County, California. In the summer of that year, he and another doctor treated at least one Native American, using squaws as nurses, after fighting broke out between settlers and Jackson Valley Indians. His wife was also commended for her actions during the emergency, when it was believed that a 300-man Tuolumne war party was about to raid Lancha Plana, being a voice of reason to calm the worried residents.

He was a charter member of the Amador Society of California Pioneers and presided over the Amador County chapter's first session in Jackson, California on September 9, 1877. Boarman spent seventeen years as the county physician until his death on November 22, 1880, while fighting a smallpox epidemic. His wife Mary Ann died in San Francisco in December 1897, and was buried in Jackson alongside her late husband and mother. Their daughter Emma, with her husband James J. Wright, occupied the family home and, as of 1928, was the last of the family still living in the region.
