= MS-Net =

- Developer: Microsoft
- Written in: x86 assembly
- OS family: DOS
- Working state: Discontinued
- Source model: Closed source
- Initial release: April 2, 1985; 40 years ago
- Marketing target: Local area networking
- Update method: Re-installation
- Package manager: None
- Supported platforms: x86
- Kernel type: Monolithic
- License: Proprietary
- Succeeded by: LAN Manager

MS-Net, sometimes stylized as MS-NET, is a network operating system (NOS) sold by Microsoft in the 1980s.

== Overview ==
MS-Net is not a complete networking system of its own; Microsoft licensed it to vendors who used it as the basis for server programs that ran on MS-DOS, porting it to their own underlying networking hardware and adding services on top. Version 1.0 was announced on 14 August 1984 and released along with the PC/AT on 2 April 1985. A number of MS-Net products were sold during the late 1980s, before it was replaced by LAN Manager in 1990.

MS-Net's network interface is based on IBM's NetBIOS Frames protocol definition, which allows it to be ported to different networking systems with relative ease. It does not implement the entire NetBIOS protocol, however, only the small number of features required for the server role. One key feature that was not implemented was NetBIOS's name management routines, a feature third parties often added back in. The system also supplies the program REDIR.EXE, which allows transparent file access from DOS machines to any MS-Net based server.

Several products from the mid-to-late-1980s were based on the MS-Net system. IBM's PC-Net is a slightly modified version of the MS-Net system typically used with Token Ring. Microsoft partnered with 3Com to produce the more widely used 3+Share system running on a 3Com networking stack based on the XNS protocol on Ethernet. Other well-known systems, including Banyan VINES and Novell NetWare, are not based on MS-Net, using Unix and a custom OS, respectively. They do, however, allow access to their own files via the REDIR.EXE.

In 1988 MS-Net was the second most-popular NOS with 17.1% market share, below NetWare but above AppleTalk. MS-Net was sold only for a short period of time. Microsoft and 3Com collaborated on a replacement known as LAN Manager running on OS/2, using the new Server Message Block standard for file transfer. 3Com's version of the product retains their XNS-based protocol, but 3Com soon abandoned the server market. Microsoft's version remained based on NetBIOS and supported a number of underlying protocols and hardware. LAN Manager was itself replaced in 1993 by Windows NT 3.1.

== See also ==
- Timeline of DOS operating systems
- net (command)
