= Net (command) =

Command for configurations from the command-line

net
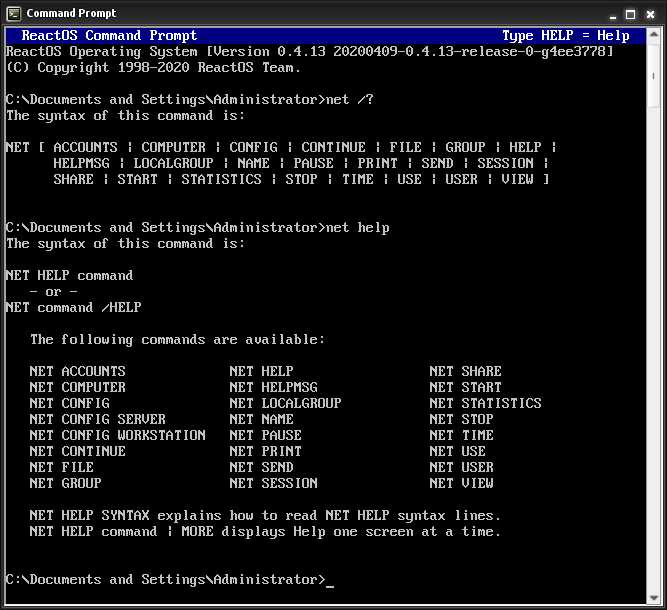
- The ReactOS net command
- Developer(s): Microsoft, IBM, ReactOS Contributors
- Initial release: April 2, 1985; 40 years ago
- Operating system: MS-Net, DOS, OS/2, Windows, ReactOS, eComStation, ArcaOS
- Platform: Cross-platform
- Type: Command
- License: MS-Net, OS/2, Windows, eComStation, ArcaOS: Proprietary commercial software ReactOS: GNU General Public License
- Website: docs.microsoft.com/en-gb/previous-versions/windows/it-pro/windows-xp/bb490948(v%3dtechnet.10)

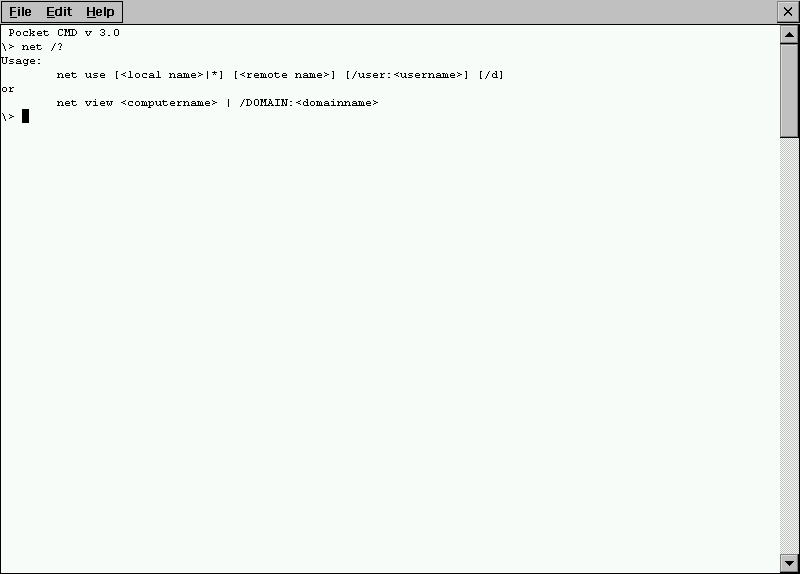
The Windows CE 3.0 net command

In computing, net is a command in IBM OS/2 (including eComStation and ArcaOS), Microsoft Windows, and ReactOS used to manage and configure the operating system from the command-line. It is also part of the IBM PC Network Program for DOS.

== Overview ==
The command is primarily used to manage network resources. It is an external command implemented as net.exe. When used in a batch file, the /Y or /N switches can be used to unconditionally answer Yes or No to questions returned by the command. The net command has several sub-commands that can differ from one implementation or operating system version to another.

On Windows CE .NET 4.2, Windows CE 5.0 and Windows Embedded CE 6.0, it is available as an external command stored in \Windows\net.exe. This version only supports the use and view sub-commands.

net sub-commands
Name	Description	DOS support	OS/2 support	Windows support	ReactOS support	Remarks
access	Manage access	No	IBM OS/2 LAN Server, OS/2 Warp 4.5	No	No	
accounts	Change Netlogon service role and manage maximum user logon time, password expiration time and other account settings	No	IBM OS/2 LAN Server, OS/2 Warp 4.5	Windows NT, Windows 2000, Windows XP, Windows Vista, Windows 7, Windows 8, Windows 10	ReactOS 0.4.8	
admin	Run administrative command on a remote server	No	IBM OS/2 LAN Server, OS/2 Warp 4.5	No	No	
alias	Manage aliases currently defined in the domain	No	IBM OS/2 LAN Server, OS/2 Warp 4.5	No	No	
app	Manage information about application definitions	No	IBM OS/2 LAN Server, OS/2 Warp 4.5	No	No	
appparm		No	OS/2 Warp 4.5	No	No	OS/2 Warp 4.5 and later only
audit	List and clear contents of the network audit log of the server	No	IBM OS/2 LAN Server, OS/2 Warp 4.5	No	No	
comm	List information about queues for shared serial devices	No	IBM OS/2 LAN Server, OS/2 Warp 4.5	No	No	
computer	Add or delete computer from domain database	No	No	Windows Server 2000, Windows Server 2003, Windows Server 2003 with SP1, Windows Server 2003 R2, Windows Server 2008, Windows Server 2012, Windows NT, Windows 2000, Windows XP, Windows Vista, Windows 7, Windows 8, Windows 10	ReactOS 0.4.8	
config	Display NetBIOS configuration information	No	IBM OS/2 LAN Server, OS/2 Warp 4.5	Windows 95, Windows 98, Windows NT, Windows 2000, Windows XP, Windows Vista, Windows 7, Windows 8, Windows 10	ReactOS 0.4.8	
continue	Continue paused services	IBM PC Network Program	IBM OS/2 LAN Server, OS/2 Warp 4.5	Windows NT, Windows 2000, Windows XP, Windows Vista, Windows 7, Windows 8, Windows 10	ReactOS 0.4.8	
copy	Copy and append files locally and remotely	No	IBM OS/2 LAN Server, OS/2 Warp 4.5	No	No	
dasd	Manage and display directory limits	No	IBM OS/2 LAN Server, OS/2 Warp 4.5	No	No	
device	List statuses of shared serial devices and stop current use of a device	No	IBM OS/2 LAN Server, OS/2 Warp 4.5	No	No	
diag	Run the Microsoft Network Diagnostic program	No	No	Windows 95, Windows 98	No	
error	List and clear network error log	IBM PC Network Program	IBM OS/2 LAN Server, OS/2 Warp 4.5	No	No	
file	List files opened by remote computers	IBM PC Network Program	IBM OS/2 LAN Server, OS/2 Warp 4.5	Windows NT, Windows 2000, Windows XP, Windows Vista, Windows 7, Windows 8, Windows 10	Unimplemented	
forward	Route incoming messages and cancel forwarding	IBM PC Network Program	IBM OS/2 LAN Server, OS/2 Warp 4.5	No	No	
group	Add, display, or modify global groups in domains	No	IBM OS/2 LAN Server, OS/2 Warp 4.5	Windows Server 2000, Windows Server 2003, Windows Server 2003 with SP1, Windows Server 2003 R2, Windows Server 2008, Windows Server 2012, Windows NT, Windows 2000, Windows XP, Windows Vista, Windows 7, Windows 8, Windows 10	ReactOS 0.4.8	
help	Display syntax	No	IBM OS/2 LAN Server, OS/2 Warp 4.5	Windows 95, Windows 98, Windows NT, Windows 2000, Windows XP, Windows Vista, Windows 7, Windows 8, Windows 10	ReactOS 0.4.8	
helpmsg	Display information on error messages	No	No	Windows NT, Windows 2000, Windows XP, Windows Vista, Windows 7, Windows 8, Windows 10	ReactOS 0.4.8	
init		No	No	Windows 95, Windows 98	No	
localgroup	Add, display, or modify local groups	No	No	Windows Server 2008, Windows Server 2012, Windows NT, Windows 2000, Windows XP, Windows Vista, Windows 7, Windows 8, Windows 10	ReactOS 0.4.8	
log	Start/stop saving messages to a file/printer and display information about forwarding the current message log	IBM PC Network Program	IBM OS/2 LAN Server, OS/2 Warp 4.5	No	No	
logoff		No	No	Windows 95, Windows 98	No	
logon		No	No	Windows 95, Windows 98	No	
move	Move files locally and remotely	No	IBM OS/2 LAN Server, OS/2 Warp 4.5	No	No	
name	List or manage NetBIOS names	IBM PC Network Program	IBM OS/2 LAN Server, OS/2 Warp 4.5	Windows NT, Windows 2000, Windows XP	Unimplemented	
password	Change passwords on a server or in a domain	No	IBM OS/2 LAN Server, OS/2 Warp 4.5	Windows 95, Windows 98	No	
pause	Pause services	IBM PC Network Program	IBM OS/2 LAN Server, OS/2 Warp 4.5	Windows NT, Windows 2000, Windows XP, Windows Vista, Windows 7, Windows 8, Windows 10	ReactOS 0.4.8	
print	Display printer queue information or print job information, or control print jobs	IBM PC Network Program	IBM OS/2 LAN Server, OS/2 Warp 4.5	Windows Server 2008, Windows Server 2012, Windows Server 2012 R2, Windows Server 2016, Windows Server (Semi-Annual Channel), Windows 95, Windows 98, Windows NT, Windows 2000, Windows XP, Windows Vista, Windows 8	Unimplemented	Deprecated in Windows 7 and Windows Server 2008 R2
riplmach		No	OS/2 Warp 4.5	No	No	OS/2 Warp 4.5 and later only
riplmclas		No	OS/2 Warp 4.5	No	No	OS/2 Warp 4.5 and later only
run		No	IBM OS/2 LAN Server, OS/2 Warp 4.5	No	No	
send	Send messages to other users or computers	IBM PC Network Program	IBM OS/2 LAN Server, OS/2 Warp 4.5	Windows NT, Windows 2000, Windows XP	Unimplemented	
separator	Control whether or not a separator page is printed at the beginning of a print file	IBM PC Network Program	No	No	No	
session	Manage server computer connections	No	IBM OS/2 LAN Server, OS/2 Warp 4.5	Windows Server 2003, Windows Server 2003 with SP1, Windows Server 2003 with SP2, Windows Server 2003 R2, Windows Server 2008, Windows Server 2008 R2, Windows Server 2008 R2 with SP1, Windows Server 2012, Windows NT, Windows 2000, Windows XP, Windows Vista, Windows 7, Windows 7 with SP1, Windows 8, Windows 10	Unimplemented	
share	Manage shared resources	IBM PC Network Program	IBM OS/2 LAN Server, OS/2 Warp 4.5	Windows Server 2008, Windows Server 2008 R2, Windows Server 2012, Windows NT, Windows 2000, Windows XP, Windows Vista, Windows 7, Windows 8, Windows 10	ReactOS 0.4.8	
start	Start services	IBM PC Network Program	IBM OS/2 LAN Server, OS/2 Warp 4.5	Windows 95, Windows 98, Windows NT, Windows 2000, Windows XP, Windows Vista, Windows 7, Windows 8, Windows 10	ReactOS 0.4.8	
statistics	Display and clear list of usage statistics for a workstation	No	IBM OS/2 LAN Server, OS/2 Warp 4.5	Windows NT, Windows 2000, Windows XP, Windows Vista, Windows 7, Windows 8, Windows 10	ReactOS 0.4.8	
status	List information about current network shares and server definition settings	No	IBM OS/2 LAN Server, OS/2 Warp 4.5	No	No	
stop	Stop services	No	IBM OS/2 LAN Server, OS/2 Warp 4.5	Windows 95, Windows 98, Windows NT, Windows 2000, Windows XP, Windows Vista, Windows 7, Windows 8, Windows 10	ReactOS 0.4.8	
time	Display remote computer's current time or sync time with remote computer	No	IBM OS/2 LAN Server, OS/2 Warp 4.5	Windows 95, Windows 98, Windows NT, Windows 2000, Windows XP, Windows Vista, Windows 7, Windows 8, Windows 10	Unimplemented	
use	Connect/disconnect computer to/from shared resources, or display information about computer connections	IBM PC Network Program	IBM OS/2 LAN Server, OS/2 Warp 4.5	Windows Server 2000, Windows Server 2003, Windows Server 2003 R2, Windows Server 2008, Windows Server 2008 R2, Windows Server 2012, Windows 95, Windows 98, Windows NT, Windows 2000, Windows XP, Windows Vista, Windows 7, Windows 8, Windows 10, Windows CE .NET 4.2, Windows CE 5.0, Windows Embedded CE 6.0	ReactOS 0.4.8	
user	Add or modify user accounts, or display user account information	No	IBM OS/2 LAN Server, OS/2 Warp 4.5	Windows Server 2000, Windows Server 2003, Windows Server 2003 R2, Windows Server 2003 with SP1, Windows Server 2008, Windows Server 2012, Windows NT, Windows 2000, Windows XP, Windows Vista, Windows 7, Windows 8, Windows 10	ReactOS 0.4.8	
ver	Display information about workgroup redirector	No	No	Windows 95, Windows 98	No	
view	Display list of domains, computers, or resources shared by specified computers	No	IBM OS/2 LAN Server, OS/2 Warp 4.5	Windows Server 2000, Windows Server 2003, Windows Server 2003 R2, Windows Server 2008, Windows Server 2008 R2, Windows Server 2012, Windows 95, Windows 98, Windows NT, Windows 2000, Windows XP, Windows Vista, Windows 7, Windows 8, Windows 10, Windows CE .NET 4.2, Windows CE 5.0, Windows Embedded CE 6.0	Unimplemented	
who	List uses who are logged on current or remote domains, display user logon information, and list users with sessions to a specific server	No	IBM OS/2 LAN Server, OS/2 Warp 4.5	No	No	

== Example ==
The net use command has several network-related functions.

=== Connecting network drive and printer ===
net use can control mounting ("mapping" in Microsoft terminology) drive shares and connecting shared printers in a network environment. This command makes use of the SMB (server message block) and the NetBIOS protocol on port 139 or 445. The basic Windows XP configuration enables this functionality by default. Thus users can connect to and disconnect from shared resources such as computers, printers and drives.

net use can display a list of network-connection information on shared resources.

=== Null session connections ===
net use also connects to the IPC$ (interprocess communication share). This is the so-called null session connection, which allows unauthenticated users. The basic syntax for connecting anonymously is:

net use \\IP address\IPC$ "" /u:""

For example, typing at the command prompt:

net use \\192.168.1.101\IPC$ "" /u:""

attempts to connect to the share IPC$ of the network 192.168.1.101 as an anonymous user with blank password. If successfully connected to the target machine, a lot of information can be gathered such as shares, users, groups, registry keys and more. This would provide a hacker with a lot of information about a remote user. This has changed in Windows NT 4.0 SP6 already. In Windows 2000 "null session connections" could have been enabled after changes of the system-configuration.

== Similar commands in other OSes ==
- Novell NetWare
  - map for mapping volumes (network drives) to drive letters
  - capture for capturing print queues to LPT ports

== See also ==
- List of DOS commands
- MS-Net
