= Chipcom =

Chipcom Corporation was an early pioneering company in the Ethernet hub industry. Their products allowed Local Networks to be aggregated in a single place instead of being distributed across the length of a single coaxial cable. They competed with now-gone companies such as Cabletron Systems, SynOptics, Ungermann-Bass, David Systems, Digital Equipment Corporation, and American Photonics, all of which were early entrants in the "LAN Hub" industry. Chipcom also was involved in Token Ring, FDDI, and Asynchronous Transfer Mode (ATM).

Some of Chipcom's innovations at the time are well-documented in the trade press of the era, such as Computerworld.

In 1995, Chipcom was acquired by 3Com for $700 million in stock., although Cabletron was also interested in buying the company. 3Com was acquired by Hewlett-Packard in 2011. The firm's CEO at the time was John Robert Held.
