= IWF =

IWF may refer to:

- International Women's Forum (founded 1974), a global organization of 8,000+ members, comprising leaders in government, business, science, the arts, athletics, finance, philanthropy, etc..
- Independent Women's Forum, a conservative non-profit organization, founded in 1992 out of the "Women for Clarence Thomas" ad hoc group.
- Independent Wrestling Federation, a professional wrestling promotion based in Nutley, NJ, United States
- Institut für Weltraumforschung (Space Research Institute), an Austrian space institute
- International Wargames Federation, international body uniting national wargaming federations of South Africa
- International Weightlifting Federation, the international governing body for the sport of weightlifting
- Internet Watch Foundation, an online policing organization in the United Kingdom
- Inter-working Function, a conversion interface between wireless and telephone networks
- iShares Russell 1000 Growth Index, an exchange-traded fund with ticker symbol IWF
