= Metropark =

Metropark may refer to:

- A regional park, sometimes known as a metropolitan park (metropark)
- Cleveland Metroparks, a regional parks system in the Greater Cleveland area
- Huron-Clinton Metroparks, a regional parks system in the Detroit area
- Metropark Communications, a telecommunications corporation
- Metropark station, a train station in Iselin, New Jersey
- Metropark USA, defunct American lifestyle clothing retailer based in Los Angeles
