= Sytek =

Whittaker Communications, Inc.
- Formerly: Sytek, Inc.; Hughes LAN Systems (until 1995)
- Industry: Electronics
- Founded: 1979
- Founder: Michael Pliner
- Headquarters: California, United States
- Parent: Hughes Electronics

Sytek, Inc., known as Hughes LAN Systems, Inc. (HLS), after being acquired by Hughes Electronics and known as Whittaker Communications, Inc. (WCI), since April 24, 1995, created the NetBIOS API, used by Microsoft to make its early networks.

Sytek was founded in Silicon Valley and last officed in their own building on Charleston Road in Mountain View. During this crucial period in LAN development, there were two factions within IBM competing over the basic LAN architecture. One group, the telephone switch group from Geneva, liked a central hub, with a network of distributed twisted pair conductors, as is used in phone systems. The other group, Entry Systems Division from Boca Raton, liked the idea of a distributed bus architecture.

Building on prior work done by such companies as Intech Labs (aka American Modem & AMDAX), Sytek built an RF transceiver that operated on cable TV frequencies. It received in the High VHF band and transmitted in the Low VHF band. These bands were referred to as the forward and reverse channels. Within any given frequency band, it was possible to have many, many, virtual circuits between devices. In order to increase the advantage of using FDM on the cable, Sytek added an algorithm based on CSMA/CD. There were few, if any, IEEE standards at that time. All of the devices, called T-Boxes, were equipped with an EIA RS-232 serial interface, which had a 'legal' maximum data rate of 19.2 kbit/s. While this may seem slow by today's standards, it was considered very fast in 1982. Determining a need for PC-PC and (especially) PC-mainframe communications, IBM asked Sytek to manufacture LAN adapter cards based on their FDM/TDM technology for IBM PCs, which they did.

IBM saw the value of PCs as being a catalyst to sell more mainframe computers and understood that a LAN of the type Sytek made was superior to dedicated runs of RG-62 coaxial cable, which were required for 327X terminals and controllers. These IBM PC Network cards were available, from IBM for about $700 ea.

In the mid-80s, IBM moved its focus to Token Ring, and much of the rest of the market moved to Ethernet.

== See also ==
- 3Com
- Ungermann-Bass
