= ISRAEL21c =

ISRAEL21c is an American online magazine focused on technological and scientific advances made by researchers in Israel, and on covering of Israeli society and culture. The headquarters is in San Francisco.

== History ==
Israel21c was founded in December 2000 by two Silicon Valley tech entrepreneurs, Éric Benhamou, chairman of 3Com and Palm, and Zvi Alon, one of the founders and owners of Netvision. Alon was born in Israel, while Benhamou was born in Algeria, became a refugee at the time of Algerian independence, and grew up in France.

The founding executive vice-president is Larry Weinberg. The two founded Israel21c in response to the negative news coverage of Israel during the Second Intifada.

== Magazine ==
The magazine focuses on Israeli achievements in research science, medicine, technology and culture. Weinberg told the Haaretz newspaper that "We look for any product, patent, technological device, pharmaceutical, company, NGO, event or person that can show Americans how Israel adds value to American life or shares the values that underpin American life." ISRAEL21c not only assigns journalists to cover such stories, it acts as a wire service providing copy to English-language newspapers and magazines.

A number of chapters in the 2005 book Israel in the World: Changing Lives Through Innovation, were drawn from ISRAEL21c magazine articles.

The 2018 American Jewish Yearbook describes ISRAEL21c magazine as being recognized "as the single most diverse and reliable source of news and information about 21st century Israel" and the magazine's content is used aby "news sources, bloggers and businesses" worldwide.

== Media ==
In 2002, during the Second Intifada ISRAEL21c produced a television advertising campaign focused on everyday life in Israel and Israel's democratic government. The ads showed Israel in a positive light. CNN refused to air the ads asserting a duty to "avoid inflaming volatile situations or endangering its correspondents." ISRAEL21c bought airtime from local CNN affiliates.
