= Ralph Ungermann =

American engineer

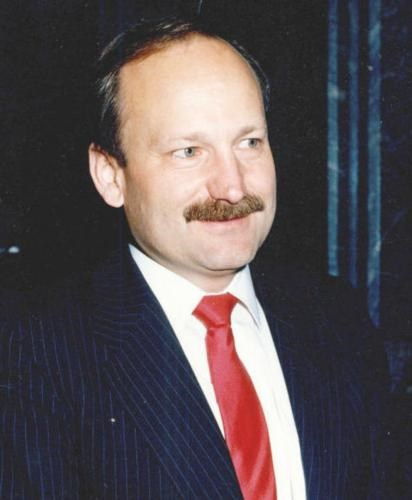
- Born: January 20, 1942; Provo, Utah, United States
- Died: June 2, 2015 (aged 73); Emeryville, California, United States
- Resting place: Fernwood Funeral Home Cemetery
- Education: B.S., University of California, Berkeley; M.S., University of California, Irvine
- Known for: Foundation of Zilog and Ungermann-Bass
- Spouses: Suzanne Welsch, Kathryn Hermansen, Ellen Coleman Ungermann
- Children: Annette Kelly, Scott Ungermann
- Scientific career
- Fields: Electronic engineering Microprocessor; Computer networking
- Institutions: Intel (1971-1974); Zilog (1974-1978); Ungermann-Bass (1979-1988); Tandem Computers (1988-1992); First Virtual Communications Inc. (FVC.com) (1993-2003); China Seed LLC (2003)

Ralph Kelley Ungermann (January 20, 1942 – June 2, 2015) was an American engineer and entrepreneur. He is best known for founding Zilog with Federico Faggin and Ungermann-Bass with Charlie Bass. Due to his work at U-B, he was considered to be a founding father of the data communications industry.

== Early life and education ==
Ralph was born in Provo, Utah on January 20, 1942. When he was 5 years old, his family moved to Santa Paula, California.

At first, Ralph wanted to study law but he changed his idea to study engineering after witnessing the launch of Sputnik 1, the first satellite ever to space. He enrolled at University of California, Berkeley and received a bachelor's degree in electrical engineering. Then he received a master's degree in computer architecture from University of California, Irvine. After college, Ralph started to work at Kodak in Rochester, NY. He then joined Collins Radio in 1967, where he became fascinated with semiconductors and early LAN technology.

Shortly before Collins Radio was acquired by Rockwell International in 1971, Ralph left in 1970 prior to business failure and joined Western Digital. There he created the first chip capable of UART communication.

== Work at Intel ==
After searching for a company involved in the semiconductor industry, Ralph joined Intel in 1971 under supervision of Federico Faggin. At Intel, he was responsible for microprocessor development and his team developed the USART and the I/O chips.

During the 1973–1974 stock market crash, Ralph and Faggin decided to leave Intel due to low wages and form their own company. At first they planned to be involved in the systems business, but as their departure became public via Electronic News due to Intel's popularity, Exxon reached out and convinced them to keep their dedication in microprocessors.

== Work at Zilog ==
In 1974, Ralph and Faggin founded Zilog, Inc., the first company dedicated to microprocessor production for the personal computer. Together with Faggin, they decide to develop a better competitor to Intel 8080. Exxon became interested in this and decided to invest in the newly founded company. Thanks to the funds from Exxon, Zilog developed the Z80 and achieved enormous commercial success.

At Zilog, Ralph also developed several I/O chips like he had done at Intel such as Z80-SIO (Serial I/O), Z80-PIO (Parallel I/O) and Z80-CTC (Counter/Timer Circuit).

Due to the success of Z80, Exxon invested more in Zilog but as a result demanded more from the company. Ungermann got dissatisfied with the pressure and clashed with the Exxon management. As a result, he was asked to leave at the end of 1978.

== Founding Ungermann-Bass ==
In 1979, Ungermann and a former Zilog employee named Charlie Bass founded Ungermann-Bass (U-B), one of the first companies to specialize in networking. With the aid of new engineers and marketing experts, the company closed its first round of venture capital financing of $1.5 Million. Ungermann expanded the company in a vast variety of fields by acquiring other companies such as Amdax in January 1983 and Linkware in February 1986.

Due to stock market crash of 1987, the company's financial status was devastated. Thinking that it was necessary to get under a big computer manufacturer to stabilize the company and reach to bigger clients, Ungermann pursued talks with Tandem Computers. In February 1988 Tandem acquired U-B for $260 Million. Ungermann became a vice-president and board member of Tandem.

== Later life and death ==
In 1993 Ralph led the foundation of a company that developed online videoconference software called First Virtual Communications. In 1997 they changed their name to FVC.com and went public on the Nasdaq exchange in April 1998 under the stock symbol FVCX.

In 2003 he was among founders of a Chinese investment company called China Seed LLC.

Ralph died on June 2, 2015, due to lewy body dementia and his remains were cremated at Fernwood Funeral Home on June 28.
