= Charlie Bass =

Charlie Bass may refer to:

- Charles Bass (born 1952), American politician
- Charlie Bass (engineer) (born 1942), American engineer and co-founder of Ungermann-Bass
- Charles C. Bass (1875–1975), American medical doctor and researcher

== See also ==
- Chuck Bass, fictional character in Gossip Girl
