= 3Station =

The 3Station was a diskless workstation, developed by Bob Metcalfe at 3Com and first available in 1986. The 3Station/2E had a 10 MHz 80286 processor, 1 megabyte of RAM (expandable to 5 MB), VGA-compatible graphics with 256 kB of video RAM, and integrated AUI/10BASE2 (BNC) network transceivers for LAN access. The product used a single printed-circuit board with four custom ASICs. It had neither a floppy disk drive nor a hard disk nor any cooling fan device, and thus it was 100% silent during operation, booting from a special "Startvolume" - (SW-Image) located at the preferred 3server-XXX Server, while also loading / storing all (HW/SW) Drivers, end-user Apps & Data files on a preferred 3Com Network Server.

Because of its very straightforward, simple and optimized internal HW and SW architecture, the 3Station/2E Nnetworking PC appeared to operate extremely fast and efficient during the daily workload for the actual Network Client.

The 3Station/2E HW (Systemboard etc.) was further embedded within a quite tasteful / stylish / slimline (1HU) mechanical Case Design far ahead from most PC Cabinet designstyles offered at the market by that time.

3Com advertised "significant cost savings" due to the 3Station's ease of installation and low maintenance (this would now be referred to under the banner of total cost of ownership). The 3Station's cost lay somewhere between that of an IBM PC clone and an IBM PC of the day. It was not commercially successful, nor were any of the similarly configured "low end" workstations that followed.

== Typical customer for 3Stations ==
3Stations's were sold as a package with a 3Server as a central hub. The Australian Taxation Office (ATO) were a significant customer for this setup (through Groupe Bull subsidiary Bull HN, née Honeywell), eventually purchasing many thousand 3Stations and associated 3Server machines. The network enabled the tax office to centrally control software versions from the Canberra office, distributing them Australia wide without the tedium and cost of updating thousands of independent, hard drive based PCs.

When the 286 processor became obsolete, the ATO opened a tender for replacement of the 3Station 2E with a suitable 386 based machine. The tender process was eventually won by Bull HN with a product labelled "3Station/386", but only shared the external case as a common part. 3Com had very little input into the design other than supplying technical help and access to networking chip sets. The internals were a custom designed single board based on the 3Com Etherlink II for networking, and ATI graphics. 3Station 2 and 3s were manufactured under license in Sydney until the contract ended.
