= American Photonics =

Early developer of local area network technologies

- Founded: 1982
- Founder: James Walyus
- Defunct: 1988
- Headquarters: United States

American Photonics, Inc. (API) was a very early developer of local area network technologies in the 1980s, based first in Brewster, New York, moving later to Brookfield Center, Connecticut.

== History ==
American Photonics, Inc., was founded in 1982 by James Walyus (1938–2000) while he was employed by Exxon Optical Information Systems (Exxon OIS) of Elmsford, New York. His intention was to create an organization that would develop leading-edge, yet commercially viable, optical communication technologies that could be sold into large potential markets.

After some initial research in networking technologies, API was contracted by Interlan (another early Ethernet networking company, subsequently acquired by Micom and then by Racal Electronics PLC) to develop an adjunct to its 10BASE5 Ethernet transceivers and network interface cards (NICs, or network cards). This adjunct product was to extend the distance between the transceiver and the NIC by way of fiber optics, as the distance was severely limited by the 15-pin Attachment Unit Interface (AUI) cable used in this connection.

Building upon this early success, API developed the RL1000 line of Ethernet 10BASE5 transceivers. The RL1000 physical design was patterned on the rugged 3Com 3C107 transceiver, with the added feature of indicator lamps much like the Cabletron Systems ST500 transceiver, and it became relatively popular as a result.

Another early Ethernet product designed by API was the RL6000 Ethernet Repeater. This unit directly competed with the Digital Equipment Corporation (DEC) DEREP-AA repeater, but had the advantages of being modular (allowing for fiber interfaces, Thinnet or AUI Cable interfaces) and smaller (occupying less than half the space of a DEREP-AA). Consequently, API was able to overtake DEC in sales of this product in 1984, a significant feat for a start-up in the Ethernet industry.

One of the last Ethernet products developed by API was the RL8000 Modular Ethernet Hub. This unit was released at about the same time as the Cabletron Systems MMAC-8 modular hub and the Astra Communications (soon to be SynOptics) LattisNet concentrator. The RL8000 was complete with network management software and modular AUI and fiber optic ports, and was supplied with RL3000 fiber-to-AUI adapters for the remote ends of the fiber optic cables. This product was successfully installed in its first customer application in 1986.

Despite raising $6 million from investors such as Welsh, Carson, Anderson & Stowe and Mura Corp. over the course of four investment rounds, American Photonics ran aground in 1987 due to a variety of reasons, among them product distribution problems, insufficient funding for growth, and the stock market crash of October 19, 1987, also known as Black Monday. Investors brought in a CEO to replace James Walyus in November 1987 and the decision to close down was made in January 1988. The company was placed in Chapter 7 Bankruptcy and its assets sold to the public in mid-1988. The rights to the design of the RL6000 were acquired by Siecor Electro-Optic Products of Research Triangle Park, NC, but they were unable to produce the unit in quantity.

Although largely forgotten at this time, API played an important role in the history of development of Ethernet technology in the early-mid 1980s. In addition to its Ethernet products, API also produced fiber optic RS-232 converters and RS-232-to-T1 time-division multiplexers (TDMs) which were provided on an OEM basis to Fibermux Corp. (later acquired by ADC Telecommunications) and early 850/1310 nm wavelength-division multiplexers (WDMs) and demultiplexers. API also developed, but did not commercially produce, a unique fiber optic power meter based on a design licensed from McDonnell Aircraft Corp. and 64Net, an early local networking hub product designed specifically for the Commodore 64 computer, in 1982.
