= COMS =

COMS may refer to:

- 3Com, a defunct digital electronics manufacturer
- City of Manchester Stadium
