= Apulet =

An apulet is a component of the Cell computer architecture consisting of a bundle comprising a data object and the code necessary to perform an action upon it. The Cell architecture calls for several APUs (Attached Processing Units) which do the primary processing of the system, under the control of a single Processing Element (PE). Each APU is loaded with its apulet by the PE and can pass its results to the next APU.

== See also ==
- Core Multiplexing Technology
- CPGA
- BINAC
