= 3+Share =

IPX/SPX
- Protocol stack
- Purpose: LAN
- Developer(s): 3Com
- Introduction: 1987; 38 years ago
- Based on: XNS
- Influenced: LAN Manager
- OSI layer: 3 to 6
- Hardware: Ethernet, others

3+Share, also known simply as 3+ or 3 Plus, was a pioneering file and print sharing product from 3Com. Introduced in the early 1980s, 3+Share was competitive with Novell's NetWare in the network server business throughout the 1980s. It was replaced by the joint Microsoft-3Com LAN Manager in 1990, but 3Com exited the server market in 1991.

== History ==
In 1984, Microsoft announced MS-Net, a framework for building multitasking network servers that ran on top of single-tasking MS-DOS. MS-Net implemented only the basic services for file and print sharing, and left out the actual networking protocol stack in favor of a virtual system in the form of IBM's NetBIOS. Vendors, like 3Com, licensed the MS-Net system and then added device drivers and other parts of the protocol stack to implement a complete server system.

In the case of 3+Share, 3Com based their networking solution on the seminal Xerox Network Systems (XNS), which 3Com's CEO Robert Metcalfe had helped design. XNS provided the networking protocol as well as connections to the underlying Ethernet hardware it ran on, which Metcalfe had also helped design. They also modified MS-Net's servers to produce what they called EtherShare and EtherPrint protocols, which could be accessed with any MS-DOS computer that had the MS-Net client software installed.

Internally, 3+Share had a network stack, file and print server modules, disk caching, user handling and more, all running simultaneously inside the DOS memory space. Because they were not limited by the PC memory map, 3+Share could support a megabyte or so of flat memory, breaking the x86 PC's 640 kB barrier. This was a large amount of RAM for the time.

They later added the XNS Name Service, which mapped network addresses to human-readable names and allowed users to look up devices by looking for strings like "3rd floor printer". Name services were part of the IBM-created NetBIOS in MS-Net, but Microsoft had left those commands out of the server, and it was common for 3rd party implementations like 3+ to add these sorts of services back in. A significant problem with this was that the name service entries could not be synchronized between departmental or enterprise deployments.

3Com soon partnered 3+Share with dedicated server hardware called the 3Server, a combination which can be seen to be the first network-attached storage system.

3Com found competing with Novell NetWare, the dominant network operating system, difficult; the company admitted that it sold more networking cards for use with NetWare than with its own software. 3Com and Microsoft jointly developed LAN Manager 2.0 as a successor to 3+Share, a product which was introduced in 1990. 3Com soon lost interest in the network software market, handing over its LAN Manager product (now called 3+Open) as well as its intellectual property to Microsoft in 1991. This work was absorbed into Microsoft and IBM's Server Message Block protocol, which is still used today.

== Technical details ==
3+Share client drivers uses less memory than corresponding ones for LAN Manager.

3+Share uses a primitive security mechanism in which the client's security level access is stored in the client's RAM. By simply changing one byte, complete control of the entire system will be gained. The security flaw was known by the manufacturer at the time the product were on the market, but not corrected.

Some of the client utilities:

- 3File (3F.EXE) - Managing file sharing
- 3Name (3N.EXE) - Managing name space
- 3Mail (3M.EXE) - Managing Email
- 3NetConnect - Provides routing functionality
- 3Print (3P.EXE) - Managing print services
