= IBM PC Network =

IBM PC's first LAN system

The IBM PC Network was IBM PC's first LAN system. It consisted of network cards, cables, and a small device driver known as NetBIOS (Network Basic Input/Output System). It used a data rate of 2 Mbit/s and carrier-sense multiple access with collision detection.

NetBIOS was developed by Sytek Inc as an API for software communication over this IBM PC Network LAN technology; with Sytek networking protocols being used for communication over the wire. IBM's later Token Ring network emulated the NetBIOS application programming interface, and it lived on in many later systems.

== Broadband ==
The original broadband version in 1984 communicated over 75 Ω cable television compatible co-axial cable with each card connecting via a single F connector. Separate transmit and receive frequencies were used. Cards could be ordered that used different frequencies so multiple cards could transmit simultaneously, at 2 Mbit/s each. A Sytek head-end device was required to translate from each card's transmit frequency to the destination card's receive frequency. Frequency-division multiplexing allowed the cable to be shared with other voice, video, and data traffic.

== Baseband ==
Later, in 1987 a much cheaper baseband version, also running at 2 Mbit/s connected computers in daisy-chain style using twisted-pair cables with 6P2C modular telephone connectors. Interface cards had two 6P2C sockets for connecting to left and right neighbor nodes. The unused sockets at the ends of the network segment had to be fitted with a terminator on one end of the chain and a wrap plug on the other. A hybrid star topology was possible using a hub.

== See also ==
- LAN Manager
