= Éric Benhamou =

French businessperson

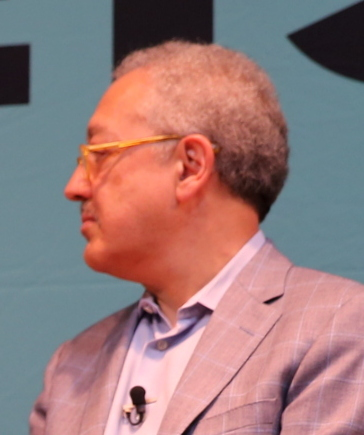
- Benhamou in 2015
- Born: 1955 (age 70–71); Tlemcen, French Algeria
- Citizenship: United States
- Education: École nationale supérieure d'arts et métiers Stanford University
- Occupation: Business

Éric Benhamou (born 1955) is a French business executive and software engineer who was the former CEO of 3Com and Palm.

== Biography ==
Born into a Sephardic Jewish family originating from Toledo, Spain, Benhamou left Algeria in 1960 with his parents during Algeria's independence war. His family settled in Grenoble, France, where he grew up and attended Lycée Champollion. He continued his studies in Paris and graduated with a "diplôme d'Ingénieur" from École nationale supérieure d'arts et métiers (Ai. 172), the youngest student to receive this degree. He subsequently was awarded a doctorate. In 1976, at the age of 20, Benhamou emigrated to the United States and enrolled at Stanford University. He graduated with a Master of Science degree.

=== 3Com and Palm ===
Benhamou worked as a software engineer for several years at Zilog, a pioneer company in microprocessors, and worked on Z-Net, the industry's first microprocessor based local area network computer system. He went on to co-found Bridge Communications in 1981 which specialized in computer network technologies. He was vice-president when the company was acquired by 3Com in 1987. Three years later, Benhamou became CEO of 3Com, a position he held between September 1990 and December 2000. During his tenure, 3Com grew approximately 20 fold and became a Fortune 500 company. In the 90's, 3Com purchased some 30 other technology companies, the largest of which in 1997 was Chicago-based USRobotics. Benhamou nurtured the integration of Palm Computing into 3Com following its acquisition as part of USRobotics in 1997. At the time of the acquisition, Palm Computing had already developed and launched the highly successful Palm Pilot, which became the most iconic handheld computer of the decade. Benhamou's leadership at 3Com helped Palm Computing grow further, leveraging its success and positioning it as a leading brand in the emerging personal digital assistant (PDA) market.

Benhamou is a co-founder of the not-for-profit foundation ISRAEL21c.

== Recognitions ==
Considered an outstanding entrepreneur, Benhamou won the Nessim Habif prize in 1997 from École Nationale Supérieure d'Arts et Métiers. He served on PITAC, the US President'a Information Technology Advisory Council, appointed by President Bill Clinton. In 1998, he received the Medal of Honor of Ellis Island that rewards most meritorious U.S. immigrants.

After his tenures as CEO of 3Com and of Palm, Benhamou continued to serve as chairman of both companies until their acquisition by Hewlett-Packard in April 2010. He joined the board of Cypress Semiconductors in 1994 and became chairman of the board in 1998. Benhamou taught entrepreneurship at INSEAD from 2004 to 2009. He joined the board of Stanford University School of Engineering and Ben-Gurion University of the Negev. In 2001, he co-founded the Israel Venture Network, a venture philanthropy organization, and served as its chairman. In 2003, Benhamou started his venture capital investment firm, Benhamou Global Ventures, and continues to engage in the creation and growth of new startup companies in information technology.

== Current positions ==
- Founder and General Partner, Benhamou Global Ventures
- Chairman of the Board, Israel Venture Network
- President of American Friends of Arts et Métiers ParisTech
- Board member of Stanford University's School of Engineering

== Former board memberships ==
- Board member of Cypress Semiconductor

== Expired offices ==
- Chairman and CEO of 3Com
- Chairman and CEO of Palm, Inc.

== Awards ==
- Nessim Habif Prize 1997
- Medal of Honor of Ellis Island
