= Kerbango =

American company and its Internet radio

Kerbango Internet Radio
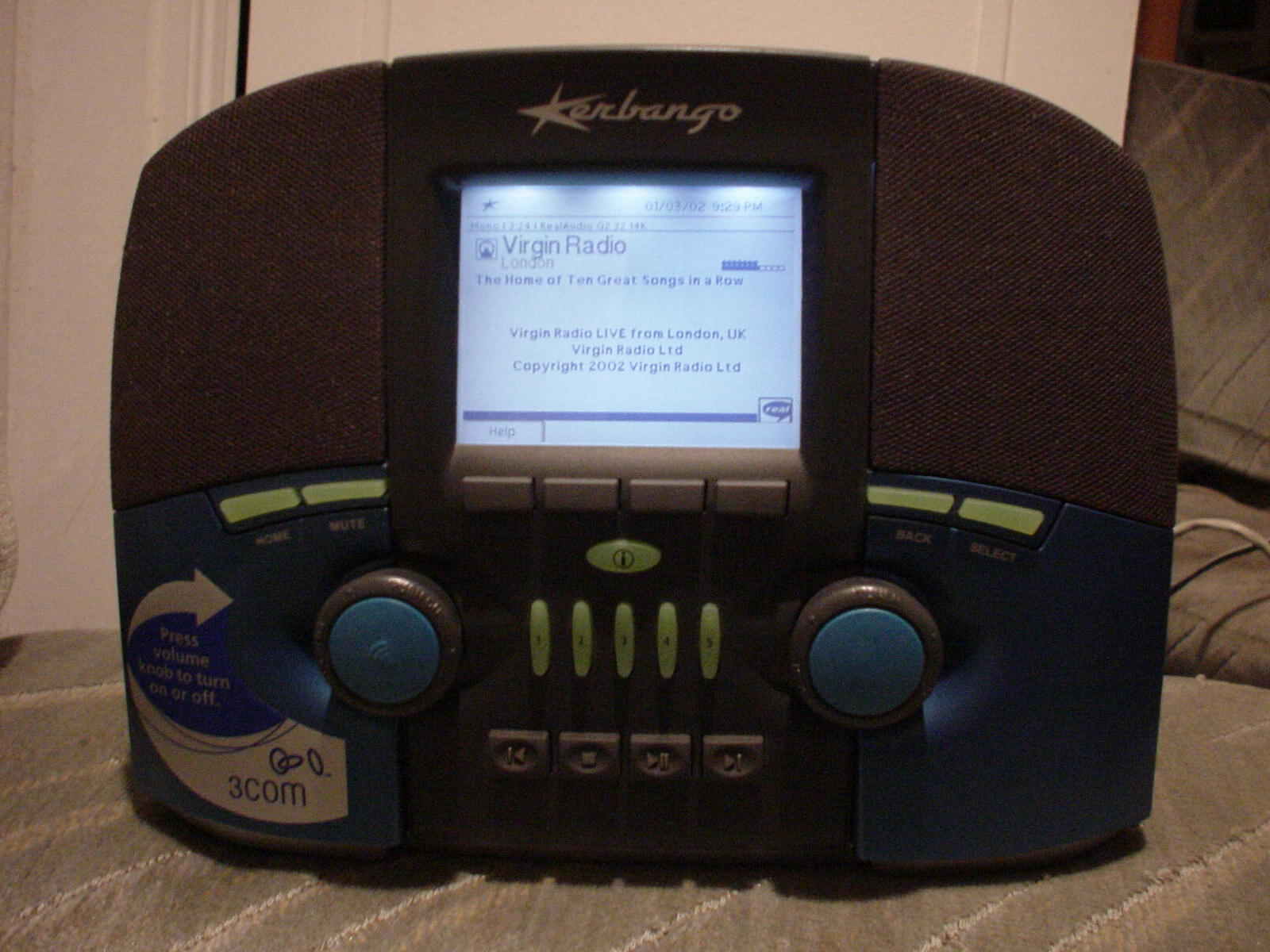
- Type: Internet radio
- Released: Announced, but never released
- Discontinued: March 2001
- Operating system: Linux
- CPU: 80 MHz PowerPC
- Memory: 8 MB DRAM

Kerbango was both a company acquired by 3Com and its lead product. Kerbango was founded in 1998 in Silicon Valley by former executives from Apple Computer and Power Computing Corporation. On June 27, 2000, 3Com announced it was acquiring the Kerbango company in an $80 million deal. As part of the deal, Kerbango's CEO, Jon Fitch, became vice president and general manager of 3Com's Internet Audio division, working under Julie Shimer, then vice president and general manager of 3Com's Consumer Networks Business.

== Kerbango Internet Radio ==
The "Kerbango Internet Radio" was intended to be the first stand-alone product that let users listen to Internet radio without a computer. Linux Journal quipped that the Kerbango 100E, the prototype, looked "like a cross between an old Wurlitzer jukebox and the dashboard of a '54 Buick." This initial model was even advertised on Amazon.com in anticipation of its sale, although it was never released.

The Kerbango 100E was an embedded Linux device (running Montavista's Hard Hat Linux), reportedly using RealNetworks' G2 Player to play Internet audio streams (RealAudio G2, 5.0, 4.0, and 3.0 streams as well as streaming MP3). A broadband connection to the Internet was required as dial-up connections were not supported. In addition to Internet streams, the 100E featured an AM/FM tuner. The Kerbango radio's tuning user interface was designed by Alan Luckow and long-time Apple QuickTime developer Jim Reekes and was later adopted for use within iTunes.

The Kerbango radio also had a companion website which allowed the user to control various aspects of the radio, save presets and edit account information. The website also acted as a streaming radio search engine, where users could search for, and listen to streaming radio stations through their browser.
