= 3Server =

Network-attached storage

The 3Com 3Server was a headless dedicated network-attached storage machine designed to run 3Com local area network (LAN) server software, 3+Share.

== Background ==
The companion product was the diskless 3Station network workstation, a dedicated client machine. However, 3Servers could also network with standard PC-compatibles and were commonly used in this role. Having no display other than a small one-line LCD and no keyboard or mouse interface, 3Servers were controlled via another PC on the network which allowed console access to the internal server software.

The original 3Server was a x86 computer that wasn't compatible with any ordinary PC based on an Intel 80186 CPU, running a special version of MS-DOS and 3Com's proprietary 3+Share network server software. This was a multitasking network server stack that ran on top of single-tasking DOS. Internally, it had a network stack, file and print server modules, disk caching, user handling and more, all running simultaneously inside the DOS memory space. Because they were not limited by the PC memory map, 3Servers could support 1 megabyte of flat memory, breaking the PC's 640 kB barrier. This was a large amount of RAM for the time.

The original 3Server shipped in 1985 with 512 kB of RAM and a single 36 MB hard disk. It had slots for adding six additional drives, making it one of the first network attached storage (NAS) arrays. It supported both Ethernet (then branded EtherSeries) and AppleTalk and was quick to add IBM Token Ring as well. The 3Server/70, introduced in July 1985, doubled the storage space to 70 MB. The 3Server/500 was a 80386-based version introduced in the late 1980s, with the 80486-based 3Server/600 introduced in 1991.

The last models, the 3Server386 family, ran OS/2 1.3 as the basic operating system, using 3+Open, a variant of OS/2 LAN Manager. 3Com's version was an enhancement of the basic LAN Manager package, also sold by Microsoft and IBM and on other operating systems - for example, running on VAX/VMS it was the basis of DEC Pathworks.

== Decline ==
In February, 1991, 3Com announced that it would hand over all rights to LAN Manager, 3+Open, its Macintosh and NetWare integration, and related software to Microsoft. The company soon exited the network server business as well.
