= Banyan Systems =

American software company

Banyan Systems, Inc.
- Founded: 1983
- Founders: Anand Jagannathan, Larry Floryan, David C. Mahoney
- Headquarters: Westboro, Massachusetts
- Products: VINES

Banyan Systems, Inc., was founded in 1983 by Anand Jagannathan, a software engineer and mid-level manager at Data General, Larry Floryan and David C. Mahoney. The company's distinctive logo was a Banyan tree and the logo's allegorical representation was of Banyan's product suite, Banyan VINES. Jim Allchin, although not a founder, was one of the first employees hired. The company was headquartered in Westboro, Massachusetts, along the high-tech I-495 corridor.

Banyan was a privately held entity for nearly ten years after its incorporation. Later the company went public. Subsequently it went into decline, facing competition from Novell NetWare and even more so from Microsoft Windows NT.

In 1997, the company changed its name to Banyan Worldwide. In October 1999 Banyan Worldwide became ePresence, an internet services company providing collaboration, security and identity management solutions. At the same time, it announced the obsolescence of VINES and other Banyan products. On October 24, 2003 ePresence announced that it would cease operations and its assets would be acquired by Unisys.
