= Bruce Claflin =

American technology chief executive

- Education: Pennsylvania State University
- Occupations: Director of Ciena and IDEXX Laboratories

Bruce Claflin is an American businessman, who has been on the boards of 3Com Corporation, Time Warner Telecom, and Advanced Micro Devices (AMD), where he was chairman for 14 years. He is a director of Ciena and IDEXX Laboratories.

== Early life ==
Claflin was born in 1952, and received his bachelor of arts degree in political science from Pennsylvania State University.

== Career ==
In 1973, Claflin joined IBM in a sales position. Over a 22 year career he held a number of senior positions in Sales, Marketing, Research, Development and General Management both in the US and overseas. In 1992 Claflin led the team which developed the IBM ThinkPad line of products after which he became President of Personal Computers/America. Claflin left IBM in 1995 to become Senior Vice President and General Manager at Digital Equipment Corp responsible for their Personal Computer Business. In 1998 he was named Executive Vice President, Sales and Marketing, a position he held until the sale of the company to Compaq Corporation.

In August 1998, he joined 3Com as President and Chief Operating Officer. In January 2001, Claflin was also appointed as a Director, shortly after which he announced significant layoffs in response to an economic downturn. He held these positions until February 2006, at which time he retired.

Claflin has been a director at Ciena since August 2006, and at IDEXX Laboratories since July 2015.
