= Ungermann-Bass =

Computer networking company

Ungermann-Bass, Inc.
- Company type: Public; Private (from 1979 until 1983)
- Industry: Computer network products
- Founded: 1979; 47 years ago
- Founder: Ralph Ungermann; Charlie Bass
- Defunct: 1997
- Fate: liquidated
- Successor: Newbridge Networks
- Headquarters: Santa Clara, California

Ungermann-Bass, Inc., also known as UB and UB Networks, was a computer networking company in the 1980s to 1990s. Located in Santa Clara, California, UB was the first large networking company independent of any computer manufacturer. Along with competitors 3Com and Sytek, UB was responsible for starting the networking business in Silicon Valley in 1979. UB was founded by Ralph Ungermann and Charlie Bass. John Davidson, vice president of engineering, was one of the creators of NCP, the transport protocol of the ARPANET before TCP.

UB specialized in large enterprise networks connecting computer systems and devices from multiple vendors, which was unusual in the 1980s. At that time most network equipment came from computer manufacturers and usually used only protocols compatible with that one manufacturer's computer systems, such as IBM's SNA or DEC's DECnet. Many UB products initially used the XNS protocol suite, including the flagship Net/One, and later transitioned to TCP/IP as it became an industry standard in the late 1980s.

Before it became the industry standard, the Internet protocol suite TCP/IP was initially a "check box" item needed to qualify on prospective enterprise sales. As a network technology supplier to both Apple Inc. and Microsoft, in 1987-88 UB helped Apple implement their initial MacTCP offering and also helped Microsoft with a Winsock compatible software/hardware bundle for the Microsoft Windows platform. With the success of these offerings and of the Internet protocol TCP/IP, both Apple and Microsoft subsequently brought the Internet technology in-house and integrated it into their core products.

UB marketed a broadband (in the original technical sense) version of Ethernet known as 10BROAD36 in the mid 1980s. It was generally seen as hard to install. UB was one of the first network manufacturers to sell equipment that implemented Ethernet over twisted pair wiring. UB's AccessOne product line initially used the pre-standard StarLAN and, when it became standard, 10BASE-T.

UB went public in 1983. It was bought by Tandem Computers in 1988. UB was sold in 1997 by Tandem to Newbridge Networks. Over the next several months, Newbridge laid off the bulk of the Ungermann-Bass employees, and closed the doors of the Santa Clara operation. Newbridge was later acquired by Alcatel, a French telecommunications company.

== See also ==
- 3Com
- Sytek
