= Metropark Communications =

Telecommunications based corporation in the United States

Metropark Communications, Inc.
- Type: Private
- Industry: Telecommunications
- Founded: 1993
- Headquarters: St. Louis, Missouri
- Key people: Glenn Conley, Pres. & CEO.
- Website: www.metropark.com

Metropark Communications is a telecommunications based corporation in the United States. Its popularity with small and medium enterprise started with consolidating multiple vendors into one communication package for subscribing companies.

VCP Program

To achieve a complete and total communication offering, in 1999, Metropark started providing local service, long distance service, internet bandwidth, cellular service, telephony systems, networking systems, computer systems, and support services to subscribing companies. The Metropark business model became known as the Vendor Consolidation Program in 2001.

In 2003, using computer telephony integration technology, Metropark started developing high-end software applications for its subscribing companies and to the software dealer community. These applications provided additional productivity enhancing elements to small and medium enterprise companies.

In 1999, 3Com partnered with Metropark to develop a VoIP strategy, which included; sales, installation, helpdesk, training, and ongoing support for its popular NBX product line.
