= IBM LAN Server =

- Developer: IBM; Microsoft
- OS family: OS/2
- Working state: Discontinued
- Source model: Closed source
- Initial release: 1988; 37 years ago
- Final release: 5.1 / 1999; 26 years ago
- Marketing target: Local area networks
- License: Proprietary
- Preceded by: IBM PC LAN Program

IBM LAN Server is a discontinued network operating system introduced by International Business Machines (IBM) in 1988. LAN Server started as a close cousin of Microsoft's LAN Manager and first shipped in early 1988. It was originally designed to run on top of Operating System/2 (OS/2) Extended Edition. The network client was called IBM LAN Requester and was included with OS/2 EE 1.1 by default. (Eventually IBM shipped other clients and supported yet more. Examples include the IBM OS/2 File/Print Client, IBM OS/2 Peer, and client software for Microsoft Windows.) Here the short term LAN Server refers to the IBM OS/2 LAN Server product. There were also LAN Server products for other operating systems, notably AIX—now called Fast Connect—and OS/400.

== Version history ==
Version no.	Year	Notes
1.0	1988	for OS/2 EE 1.0
1.2	1990	for OS/2 EE 1.2
1.3	1991	for OS/2 EE 1.3
2.0	1992	related to LAN Manager 2.0
3.0	1993	Entry and Advanced versions (no LAN Manager "cousin" from here on)
4.0	1994	Entry and Advanced versions, new object-oriented user interface
5.0	1996	included in OS/2 Warp Server
5.1	1999	included in OS/2 Warp Server for e-business

Predecessors included IBM PC LAN Program (PCLP). Variants included LAN Server Ultimedia (optimized for network delivery of multimedia files) and LAN On-Demand. Add-ons included Directory and Security Server, Print Services Facility/2 (later known as Advanced Printing), Novell NetWare for OS/2, and LAN Server for Macintosh.

== Innovations ==
LAN Server pioneered certain file and print sharing concepts such as domains (and domain controllers), networked COM ports, domain aliases, and automatic printer driver selection and installation.

== See also ==
- LAN messenger
- Server Message Block (SMB)
