= Charlie Bass (engineer) =

American electrical engineer (born 1942)

- Born: 1942 (age 83–84); United States
- Education: M.S.,University of Miami; PhD, University of Hawaiʻi at Mānoa
- Known for: Foundation of Ungermann-Bass
- Scientific career
- Fields: Electrical engineering Microprocessors; Computer networking
- Workplaces: University of Berkeley (1972–1975); Zilog (1974–1978); Ungermann-Bass (1979–1985, 1986–1987); Bass Associates(1989)

Charlie Bass is an American electrical engineer, academic and entrepreneur. He was the co-founder of the networking company Ungermann-Bass in 1979. Led by Ralph Ungermann and staffed by several colleagues from Zilog, Ungermann-Bass helped commercialize Ethernet, had a successful IPO, and then was purchased by Tandem Computers.

Bass was also co-founder of Parallan Computer in July 1986, a maker of high-specification, multi-processor servers, and Starlight Networks in late 1990, a software company involved in streaming media and Socket Mobile, Inc. in 1992.

In 1972, Bass received a Ph.D. in electrical engineering from the University of Hawaiʻi at Mānoa. He has taught at University of California, Berkeley; University of California, Santa Cruz; and Stanford University, and he worked for Zilog. In 1989, he formed his own venture capital company, Bass Associates. Bass is currently an advisor to Rising Tide, a venture capital partnership.
