= 3Com =

Former American maker of computer network products

3Com Corporation
- last logo designed by Interbrand from 2000 to 2010
- Type: Public
- Traded as: Nasdaq: COMS (1984–2010), S&P 500 component (until 2010)
- Industry: Computer network products
- Founded: 1979; 47 years ago
- Founder: Robert Metcalfe and others
- Defunct: April 12, 2010; 16 years ago
- Fate: Acquired by Hewlett-Packard
- Headquarters: Marlborough, Massachusetts
- Parent: Hewlett-Packard (2009–2010)
- Website: Official website

3Com Corporation was an American digital electronics manufacturer best known for its computer network products. The company was co-founded in 1979 by Robert Metcalfe, Howard Charney and others. Bill Krause joined as President in 1981. Metcalfe explained the name 3Com was a contraction of "Computer Communication Compatibility", with its focus on Ethernet technology that he had co-invented, which enabled the networking of computers.

3Com provided network interface controller and switches, routers, wireless access points and controllers, IP voice systems, and intrusion prevention systems. The company was based in Santa Clara, California. From its 2007 acquisition of 100 percent ownership of H3C Technologies Co., Limited (H3C) —initially a joint venture with China-based Huawei Technologies—3Com achieved a market presence in China, and also sold products in Europe, Asia, and the Americas. 3Com products were sold under the brands 3Com, H3C, and TippingPoint.

On April 12, 2010, Hewlett-Packard completed the acquisition of 3Com. It was merged into HPE's Aruba Networks business unit following HP's acquisition of Aruba in 2015 and subsequent split into HPE later that same year.

== History ==
=== Xerox PARC (1972–1979) ===
After reading an article on ALOHAnet, Robert Metcalfe became interested in computer networking. ALOHAnet was an over-the-air wide area network system in Hawaii using ultra high frequency radios and made several assumptions that Metcalfe thought would not be correct in practice. He developed his own theories of how to manage traffic, and began to consider an "ALOHAnet in a wire" networking system. In 1972, he joined Xerox PARC to develop these ideas, and after pairing up with David Boggs, the two had early 3 Mbit/s versions of Ethernet working in 1973. They then went on to build up a networking protocol known as PARC Universal Packet (PuP), with the entire system ready for build-out by late 1974.

At this point, Xerox management did nothing with it, even after being approached by prospective customers. Increasingly upset by management's lack of interest, Metcalfe left Xerox in 1975, but he was lured back again the next year. Further development followed, resulting in the seminal Xerox Network Systems (XNS) protocol, which was completed by 1978. Once again, Metcalfe found that management was unwilling to actually do anything with the product, and he threatened to leave and in 1979 he left the company.

=== Founding and early days (1979–1996) ===
Metcalfe subsequently co-founded 3Com in 1979. The other co-founders were Metcalfe's college friend Howard Charney and two others. Bill Krause joined as President in 1981 and became CEO in 1982 and led 3Com until 1992 when he retired. 3Com began making Ethernet adapter cards for many early 1980s computer systems, including the DEC LSI-11, DEC VAX-11, Sun-2 and the IBM PC. In the mid-1980s, 3Com branded their Ethernet technology as EtherSeries, while introducing a range of software and PC-based equipment to provide shared services over a local area network (LAN) using XNS protocols. These protocols were branded EtherShare (for file sharing), EtherPrint (for printing), EtherMail (for email), and Ether-3270 (for IBM host emulation). 3Com became a public company via an initial public offering (IPO) in 1984.

The company's network software products included:

- 3+Share file and printer sharing.
- 3+Mail e-mail.
- 3+Route for routing XNS over a 3+ Server serial port towards a remote 3+ (Route) LAN.
- 3+Remote/PC for routing XNS towards a Remote 3+ PC Workstation serial port.
- 3+NetConnect to support flexible XNS routing between a number of connected 3+ Ethernets AND/OR Token Ring Networks.
- 3+3270/SNA Gateway to enable standard 3+ MS-DOS workstations to emulate standard IBM 3270 Terminals, via the 3+ LAN and the connected SNA Gateway, towards a remote IBM-compatible mainframe system
- MultiConnect (?) was a chassis-based multi-port 10BASE2 Ethernet repeater.
- 3Server, a server-grade PC for running 3+ services.
- 3Station, a diskless workstation.
- 3+Open file and printer sharing (based on Microsoft's LAN Manager).
- Etherterm terminal emulation.
- Etherprobe LAN analysis software.
- DynamicAccess software products for Ethernet load balancing, response time, and RMON II distributed monitoring.

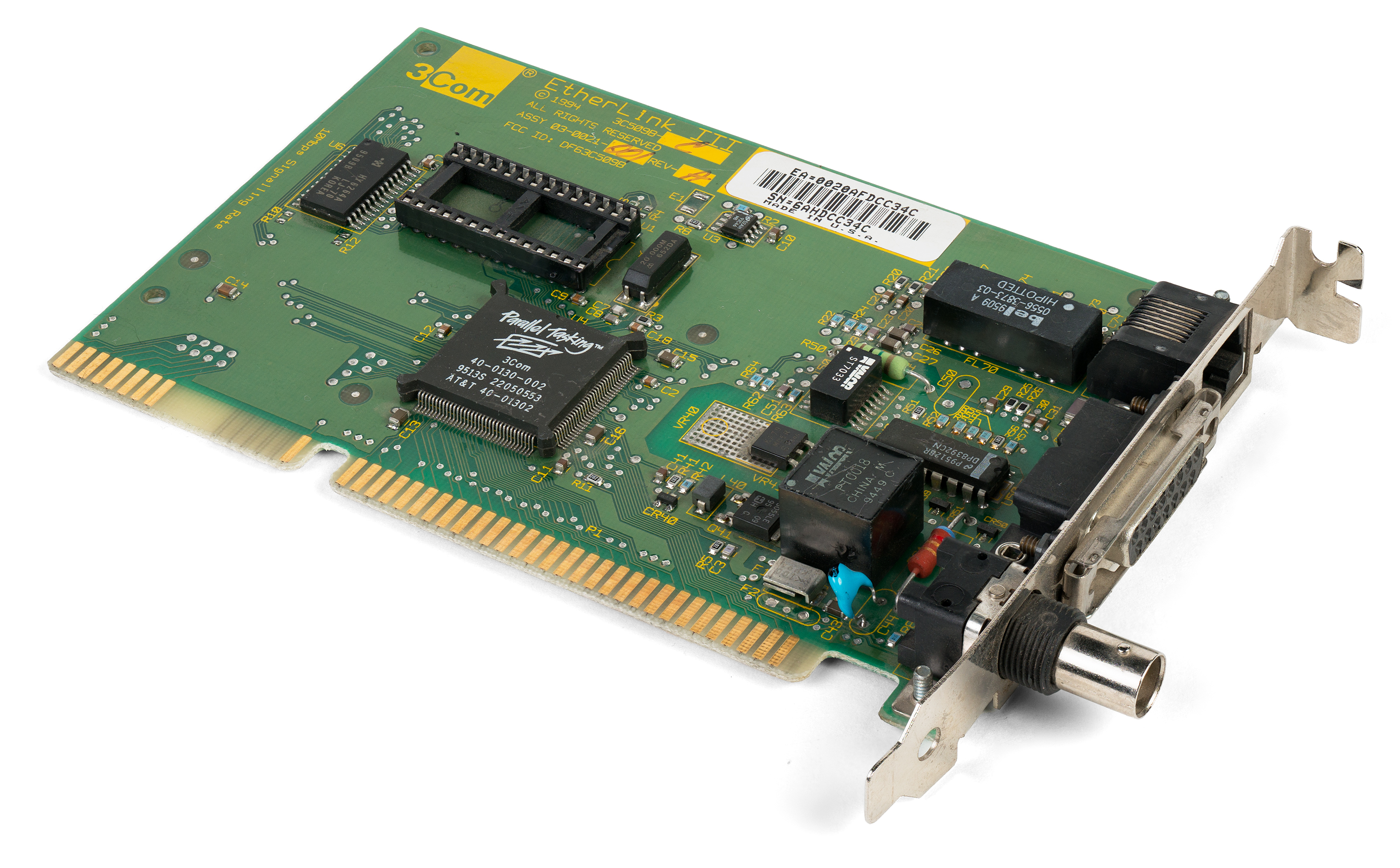
3Com 3C509BC (Etherlink III) Ethernet NIC from mid-1990s with 10BASE2, 15-pin AUI and 10BASE-T connectors

3Com's expansion beyond its original base of PC and thin Ethernet products began in 1987 when it merged with Bridge Communications. This provided a range of equipment based on Motorola 68000 processors and using XNS protocols compatibly with 3Com's Etherterm PC software.

- CS/1, CS/200 communication servers ("terminal servers")
- Ethernet bridges and XNS routers
- GS/1-X.25 X.25 gateway
- CS/1-SNA SNA gateway
- NCS/1 network control software running on a Sun Microsystems computer

By 1995, 3Com's status was such that it was able to enter into an agreement with the city of San Francisco to pay $900,000 per year for the naming rights to Candlestick Park. That agreement ended in 2002.

=== 1997–2000 ===
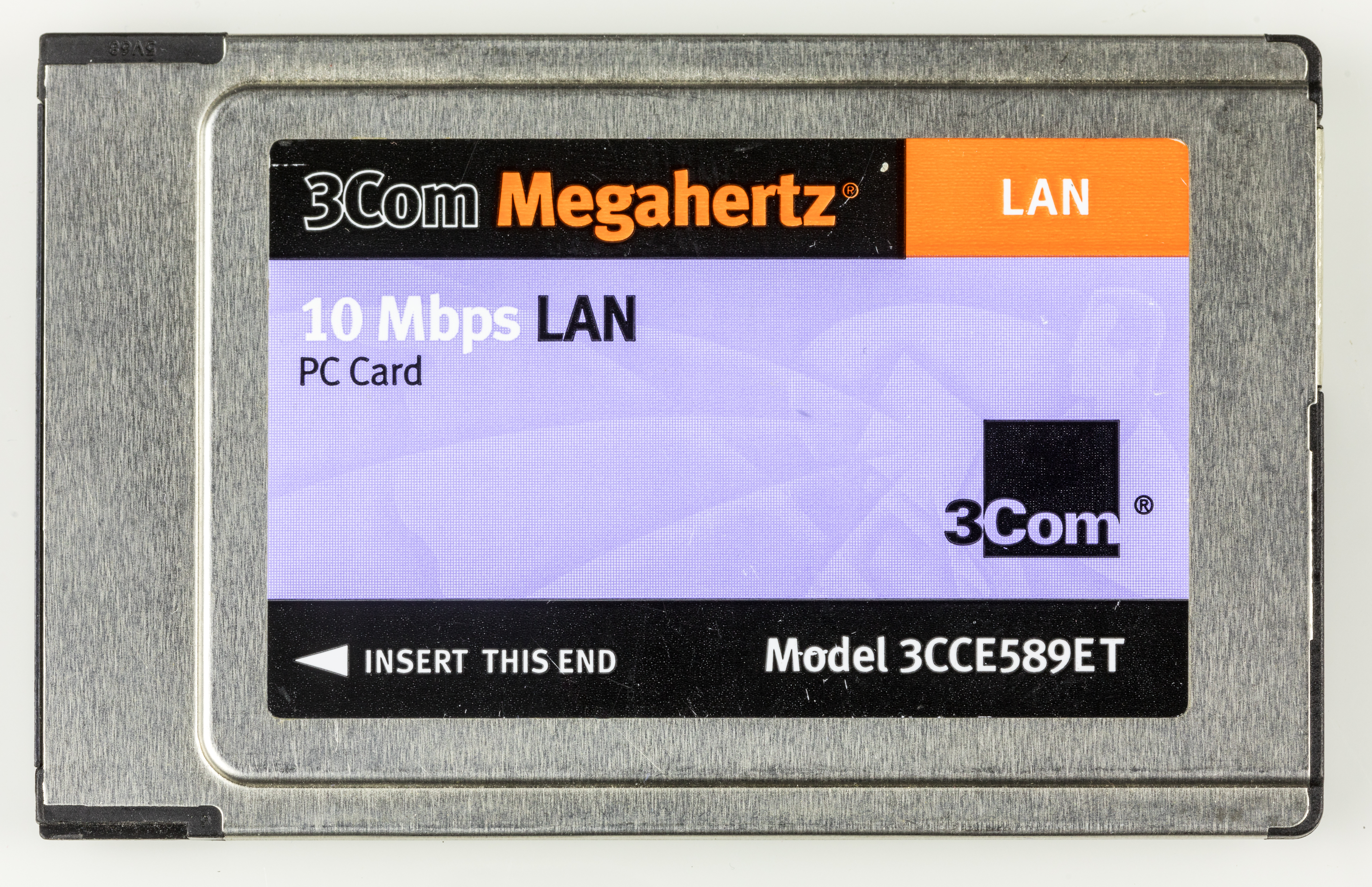
3Com PC Card for 10BASE-T

In 1997, 3Com merged with USRobotics (USR), a maker of dial-up modems, and owner of Palm, Inc. USRobotics was known for its Sportster line of consumer-oriented modems, as well as its Courier business-class modem line. This merger spelled the beginning of the end of 3Com. In addition to consumer network electronics, USRobotics was a well-known manufacturer of a dialup access server, the "Total Control Hub", rebadged by 3Com as the "Total Control 1000", based largely on its Courier modem technology. This key business product competed against Cisco's AS5200 access server line in the mid-1990s as the explosion of the Internet led to service provider investment in dialup access server equipment. 3Com continued the development of the Total Control line until it was eventually spun off as a part of Commworks, which was then acquired by UTStarcom.

In August 1998, Bruce Claflin was named chief operating officer. The modem business was rapidly shrinking. 3Com attempted to enter the DSL business, but was not successful.

In the lucrative server network interface controller (NIC) business, 3Com dominated market share, with Intel only able to break past 3Com after dramatic price slashing. It started developing Gigabit Ethernet cards in-house but later scrapped the plans. Later, it formed a joint venture with Broadcom, where Broadcom would develop the main integrated circuit component and the NIC would be 3Com branded.

In 1999, 3Com acquired NBX, a Boston company with an Ethernet-based phone system for small and medium-sized businesses. This product proved popular with 3Com's existing distribution channel and saw rapid growth and adoption. As one of the first companies to deliver a complete networked phone system, and increased its distribution channel with larger telephony partners such as Southwestern Bell and Metropark Communications, 3Com helped make VoIP into a safe and practical technology with wide adoption.

3Com then tried to move into the smart consumer appliances business and in June 2000, 3Com acquired internet radio startup Kerbango for $80 million. It developed its Audrey appliance, which made an appearance on The Oprah Winfrey Show. It scrapped the Audrey and Kerbango products less than a year later.

In March 2000, in a highly public and criticized move, 3Com exited the high-end core routers and switch market to focus on other areas of the business. The CoreBuilder Ethernet and ATM LAN switches, PathBuilder and NetBuilder WAN Routers were all discontinued June 2000. CoreBuilder products and the customer base was migrated over to Extreme Networks. The PathBuilder and NetBuilder were transitioned to Motorola. 3Com focused its efforts from 2000 to 2003 on building up the HomeConnect, OfficeConnect, SuperStack, NBX and Total Control product lines. Due to this perceived exit from the Enterprise market, 3Com would never gain momentum with large customers or carriers again.

In July 2000, 3Com spun off Palm as an independent company. Following Palm's IPO, 3Com continued to own 80 percent of Palm, but 3Com's market capitalization was smaller than Palm's. U.S. Robotics was also spun out again as a separate company at this time.

=== 2001 and beyond ===
In January 2001, Claflin became chief executive officer, replacing Éric Benhamou, CEO from 1990 to 2000. He was criticized for the costly diversification in the mobile handheld computer market. At this point, the company's main line of business, selling add-on network interface controllers ("NICs"), was also shrinking rapidly, mainly because many new computers had NICs built in. The company started slashing or selling divisions and going through numerous rounds of layoffs. The company went from employing more than 12,000 employees to fewer than 2,000.

In May 2003, the company moved its Silicon Valley Santa Clara headquarters to Marlborough, Massachusetts. It also formed a venture called H3C with Huawei, whereby 3Com would sell and rebrand products under the joint venture.

In 2003, 3Com sold its CommWorks Corporation subsidiary to UTStarcom, Inc. CommWorks was based in Rolling Meadows, Illinois, and developed wireline telecommunications and Wireless infrastructure technologies.

In January 2006, Claflin announced he would be leaving the company. In January 2006, R Scott Murray became CEO of 3Com and chairman of H3C Technology in China, the joint venture with Huawei Technologies. Murray voluntarily resigned from the company in August 2006 over his concerns about the questionable business ethics of Huawei and potential cyber security risks posed by Huawei. Edgar Masri returned to 3Com to head as president and CEO following Murray's departure.

In September 2007, Bain Capital agreed to buy the company for $2.2 billion, with minority equity financing from Huawei Technologies. However, the deal met with US government regulatory opposition and it fell through early in 2008, following concerns over Huawei's risk of conducting cyber security attacks against the United States and its allies, Huawei's former dealings in Iran, and Huawei being operated by a former engineer in China's People's Liberation Army. Edgar Masri left the company in April 2008, partially as a result of the failed Bain transaction.

In April 2008, Robert Mao was named chief executive, and Ron Sege president and chief operating officer.

In fiscal year 2008 ended May 30, 2008, 3Com had annual revenue of $1.3 billion and more than 6,000 employees in over 40 countries. In September 2008, 3Com reported financial results for its fiscal 2009 first quarter, which ended August 29, 2008. Revenue in the quarter was $342.7 million compared to revenue of $319.4 million in the corresponding period in fiscal 2008, a 7 percent increase. Net income in the quarter was $79.8 million, compared with a net loss of $18.7 million in the first quarter of fiscal year 2008.

The company reported that it had more than 2,700 engineers, with more than 1,400 United States patents and nearly 180 Chinese-issued patents, as well as more than 1050 pending Chinese applications. It also reported pending applications for 35 separate inventions outside of China covering a wide range of networking technologies.

=== Acquisition by HP ===
On November 11, 2009, 3Com and Hewlett-Packard announced that Hewlett-Packard would acquire 3Com for $2.7 billion in cash. On April 12, 2010, Hewlett-Packard completed its acquisition. When Hewlett-Packard split into Hewlett Packard Enterprise and HP Inc., the 3Com unit continued with HPE and was ultimately integrated into Aruba Networks along with the rest of HP's networking portfolio.

== Products ==
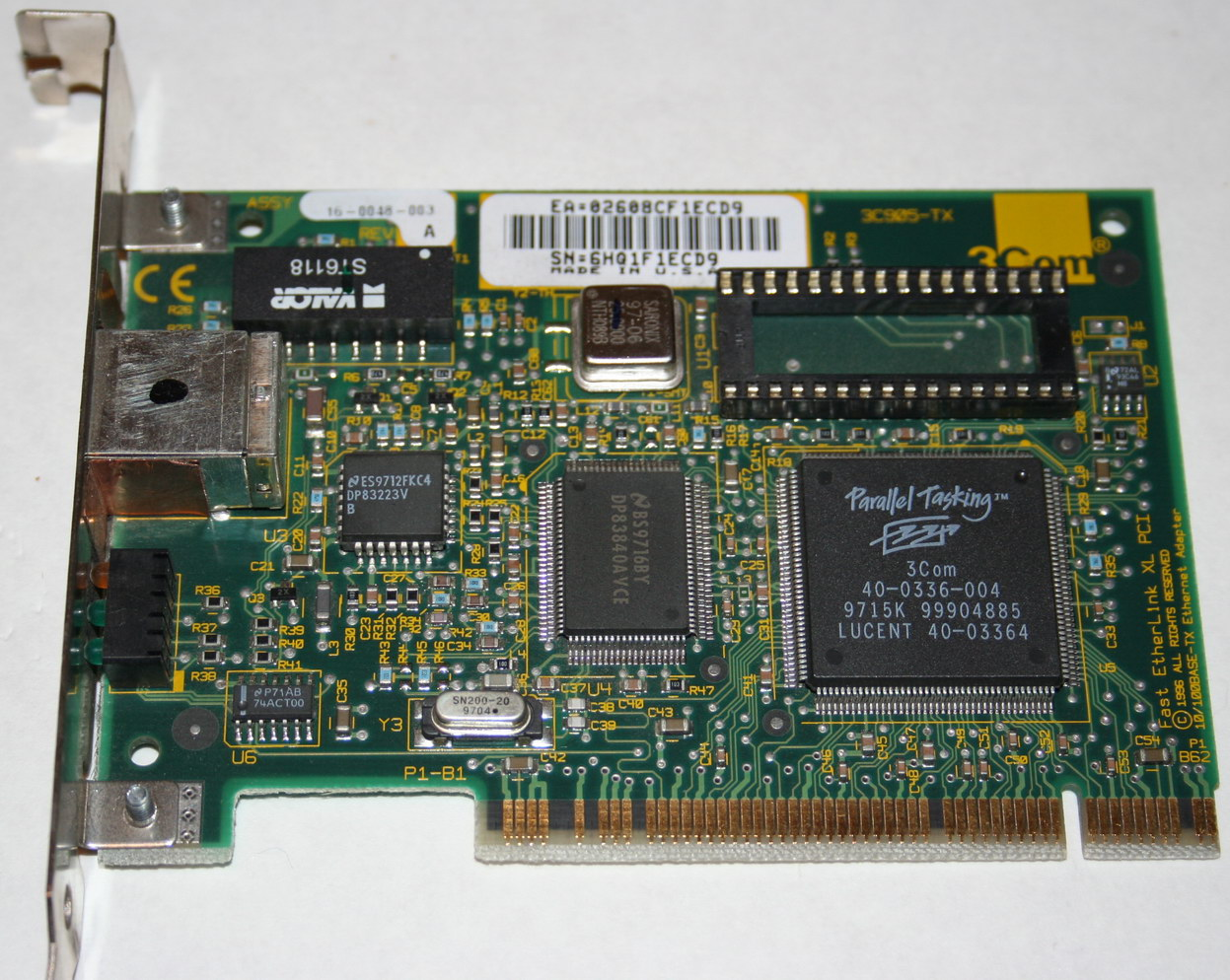
3Com 3c905-TX 10/100 PCI network interface controller

- Fixed configuration Ethernet switches including stackable switches: 3Com brand Gigabit switches Switch 5500G, 4800G, 4500G, 4200G, Baseline, OfficeConnect; 3Com brand Fast Ethernet switches Switch 5500, 4500, 4210, Baseline, OfficeConnect; H3C brand switches S5600, S5500, S5100, S3600, S3610, S3100.
- Modular Chassis switches: 3Com brand 8800, 7900E, 7500. H3C brand S9500, S7500, S7500E.
- Wide area network routers
- Wireless access points, adapters, and connectivity products
- Internet access gateways and firewalls, both wired and wireless
- Network management applications
- Network security platforms including the TippingPoint Intrusion Prevention System.
- IP Telephony applications including PBX and Computer Telephony Integration. Telecommunications products utilized Voice over Internet Protocol and Session Initiation Protocol (SIP). Voice platforms included VCX and NBX.
- Local area network interface cards
- IP Video Surveillance and Network Storage (marketed in China, South Africa, South America and other key markets)
- Consumer USB webcams and associated software (3Com HomeConnect)
- The 3Com Laser Library which, at the time, was a revolutionary CD based documentation and tech support tool (brain child of Dirk Martin)

=== Acquisitions ===
3Com came close to merging with computer maker Convergent Technologies, abandoning the pact just two days before a vote was scheduled in March 1986. Later, 3Com went on to acquire the following:

- Bridge Communications in 1987
- BICC Data Networks in 1992
- Star-Tek in 1993
- Synernetics in 1993
- Centrum in 1994
- NiceCom in 1994
- AccessWorks, Sonix Communications, Primary Access, and Chipcom in 1995
- Axon Networks and OnStream Networks in 1996
- USRobotics merger/acquisition in 1997 (included product lines: Sportster, Courier, Palm, Megahertz, Conferencelink, Audrey, and more)
- NBX in 1999
- Kerbango in 2000
- TippingPoint in 2005
- Huawei-3Com (H3C) in 2007 (Bought out Huawei's 49% stake for US$882 million from a 2003 joint venture)

=== Former subsidiaries ===
CommWorks Corporation was a subsidiary of 3Com Corporation, based in Rolling Meadows, Illinois. It was sold to UTStarcom of Alameda, California in 2003.

CommWorks was formerly the Carrier Network Business unit of 3Com, comprising several acquired companies: U.S. Robotics (Rolling Meadows, Illinois), Call Technologies (Reston, Virginia), and LANsource (Toronto, Ontario, Canada). CommWorks was able to use technology from each company to create IP softswitch and IP communications software. U.S. Robotics provided media gateways (the Total Control 1000 product line, formerly used for dial-modem termination) and softswitch technology. Call Technologies provided Unified Messaging software. LANsource provided fax-over-IP software that was integrated with the Unified Messaging platform.

The Carrier Network Business unit of 3Com developed an Inter-working function technology that became the first and dominant 2G CDMA wireless data gateway product. In partnership with Unwired Planet (now Openwave) and Qualcomm Quicknet connect allowed for 6 second connect times versus modems connecting the call in approximately 30 seconds. This product was deployed in the United States, Japan, and Korea covering the 2G CDMA market sample carriers included Sprint. It led to follow on products that became core to CommWorks now UTStarcom offerings including the 2.5 and 3G packet data gateway products known as PDSN and Home Agents.

CommWorks/3Com co-developed an H.323-based softswitch with AT&T in 1998 for use in a "transparent trunking" application for AT&T's residential long-distance customers. Long-distance telephone calls were redirected from the LEC's ingress CLASS 5 switch to the Total Control 1000 media gateway, where it was converted from TDM to IP and transported across AT&T's WorldNet IP backbone. When it reached the destination, it was passed to the egress LEC's CLASS 5 switch as an untariffed data call.

CommWorks modified the gateway and softswitch software to support SIP for MCI/WorldCom's hosted business offering in 2000.

Although 3Com sold CommWorks to UTStarcom, it retained intellectual property rights to the softswitch technology. After modifying the software to enable enterprise PBX features, 3Com released this technology as VCX, the industry's first pure SIP PBX, in 2003.

== See also ==
- HPE Networking
- 3Station
- Ungermann-Bass
- Sytek
- List of acquisitions by Hewlett-Packard
