= Local area network =

Computer network that connects devices over a limited area

Local Area Network (LAN)
- IEEE 802 Local Area Network Architecture
- A typical physical star topology used in modern local networks.
- Abbreviation: LAN
- Status: Active / Continuous Deployment
- Year started: 1970s
- Latest version: Tiered (Ethernet / Wi-Fi evolutions); Ongoing
- Organization: Institute of Electrical and Electronics Engineers (IEEE)
- Committee: IEEE 802 LMSC (LAN/MAN Standards Committee)
- Base standards: IEEE 802
- Related standards: WAN, MAN, SAN
- Domain: Computer networking, Telecommunications
- Website: ieee802.org

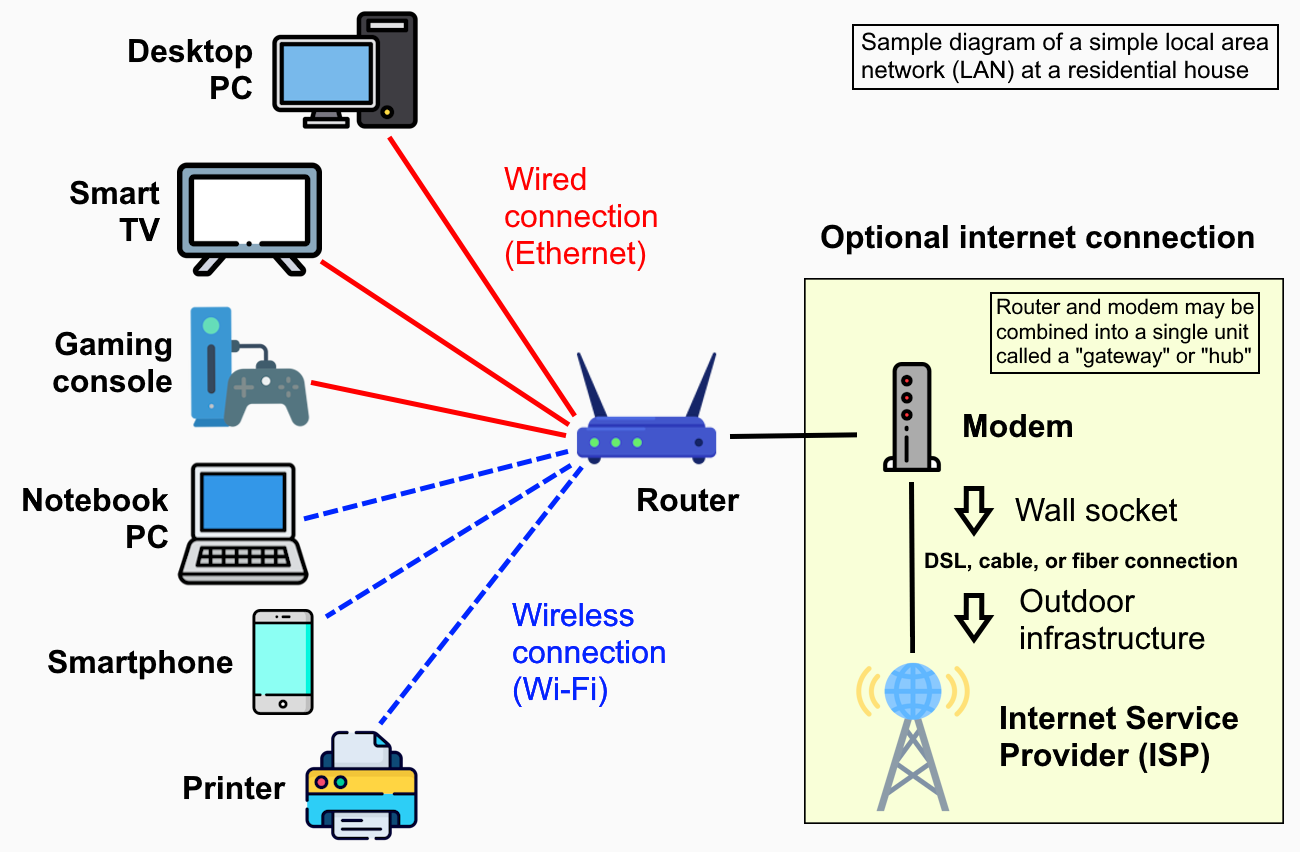
A conceptual diagram of a LAN at a residential house; the router in this case is assumed to also function as a wireless access point. Also shown in this example (shaded in yellow) is the network's connection to the Internet via fixed-line means.

A local area network (LAN) is a computer network that interconnects computers within a limited area such as a residence, campus, or building, and has its network equipment and interconnects locally managed. LANs facilitate the distribution of data and the sharing of network devices, such as printers.

The LAN contrasts the wide area network (WAN), which not only covers a larger geographic distance, but also generally involves leased telecommunication circuits or Internet links. An even greater contrast is the Internet, which is a system of globally connected business and personal computers.

Ethernet and Wi-Fi are the two most common technologies used for local area networks; historical network technologies include ARCNET, Token Ring, and LocalTalk.

== Description ==
A local area network allows multiple nearby computers to use shared resources. A 1989 survey of 100 large LAN users found that database or file sharing was the primary purpose of 67% of networks, laser printer sharing 30%, and 3% other.

== Cabling ==
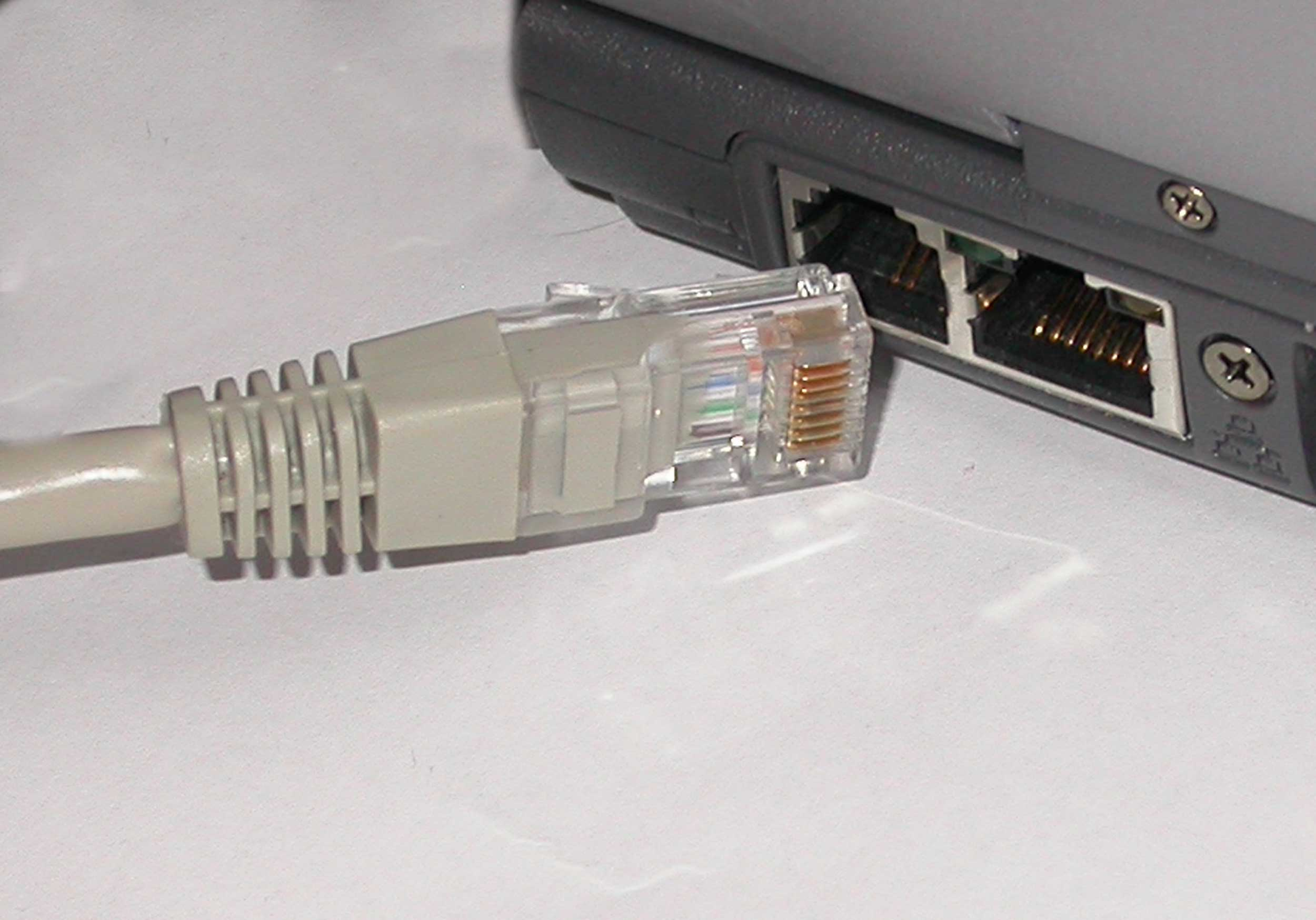
Twisted pair LAN cable

Most wired network infrastructures utilize Category 5 or Category 6 twisted pair cabling with RJ45 compatible terminations. This medium provides physical connectivity between the Ethernet interfaces present on a large number of IP-aware devices. Depending on the grade of cable and quality of installation, speeds of up to 10 Mbit/s, 100 Mbit/s, 1 Gbit/s, or 10 Gbit/s are supported.

== Wireless LAN ==
In a wireless LAN, users have unrestricted movement within the coverage area. Wireless networks have become popular in residences and small businesses because of their ease of installation, convenience, and flexibility. Most wireless LANs consist of devices containing Wireless radio technology that conforms to 802.11 standards as certified by the IEEE. Most wireless-capable residential devices operate at both the 2.4 GHz and 5 GHz frequencies and fall within the 802.11n or 802.11ac standards. Some older home networking devices operate exclusively at a frequency of 2.4 GHz under 802.11b and 802.11g, or 5 GHz under 802.11a. Some newer devices operate at the aforementioned frequencies in addition to 6 GHz under Wi-Fi 6E. Wi-Fi is a marketing and compliance certification for IEEE 802.11 technologies. The Wi-Fi Alliance has tested compliant products and certifies them for interoperability. The technology may be integrated into smartphones, tablet computers and laptops. Guests are often offered Internet access via a hotspot service.

== Infrastructure and technicals ==
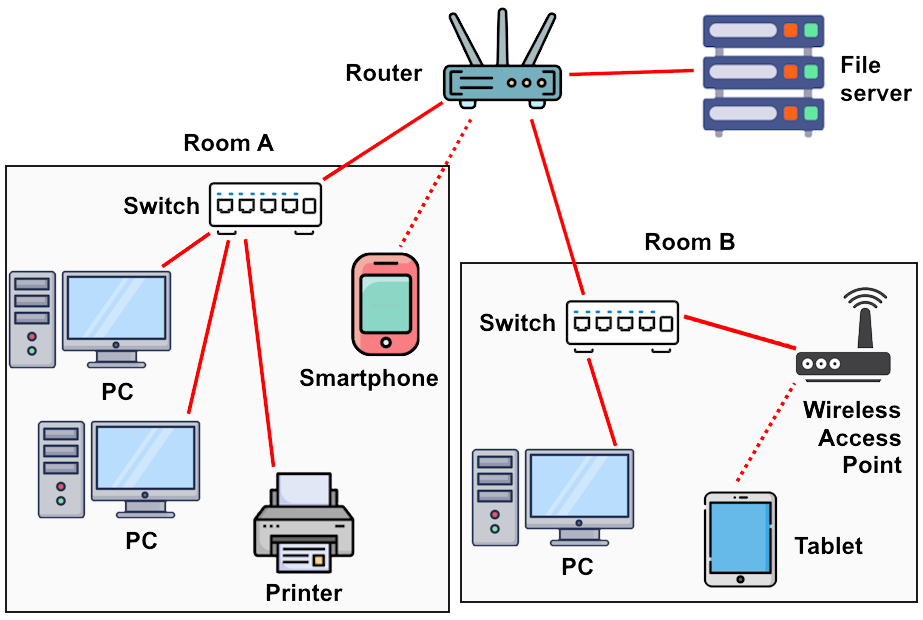
A conceptual diagram of a LAN at a small business office; this example includes two rooms, each with a switch, as well as a file server, and a mix of wired and wireless connections. This is the star topology.

Simple LANs in office or school buildings generally consist of cabling and one or more network switches; a switch is used to allow devices on a LAN to talk to one another via Ethernet. A switch can be connected to a router, cable modem, or ADSL modem for Internet access. LANs at residential homes usually tend to have a single router and often may include a wireless repeater. A LAN can include a wide variety of other network devices such as firewalls, load balancers, and network intrusion detection. A wireless access point is required for connecting wireless devices to a network; when a router includes this device, it is referred to as a wireless router.

Advanced LANs are characterized by their use of redundant links with switches using the Spanning Tree Protocol to prevent loops, their ability to manage differing traffic types via quality of service (QoS), and their ability to segregate traffic with VLANs. A network bridge binds two different LANs or LAN segments to each other, often in order to grant a wired-only device access to a wireless network medium.

Network topology describes the layout of interconnections between devices and network segments. At the data link layer and physical layer, a wide variety of LAN topologies have been used, including ring, bus, mesh and star. The star topology is the most common in contemporary times. Wireless LAN (WLAN) also has its topologies: independent basic service set (IBSS, an ad-hoc network) where each node connects directly to each other (this is also standardized as Wi-Fi Direct), or basic service set (BSS, an infrastructure network that uses a wireless access point).

Various topologies that may be used in a centralised wired LAN: star, ring, bus, and tree

=== Network layer configuration ===
DHCP is used to assign internal IP addresses to members of a local area network. A DHCP server typically runs on the router with end devices as its clients. All DHCP clients request configuration settings using the DHCP protocol in order to acquire their IP address, a default route and one or more DNS server addresses. Once the client implements these settings, it will be able to communicate on that internet.

=== Protocols ===
At the higher network layers, protocols such as NetBIOS, IPX/SPX, AppleTalk and others were once common, but the Internet protocol suite (TCP/IP) has prevailed as the standard of choice for almost all local area networks today.

=== Connection to other LANs ===
LANs can maintain connections with other LANs via leased lines, leased services, or across the Internet using virtual private network technologies. Depending on how the connections are established and secured, and the distance involved, such linked LANs may also be classified as a metropolitan area network (MAN) or a wide area network (WAN).

=== Connection to the Internet ===
Local area networks may be connected to the Internet (a type of WAN) via fixed-line means (such as a DSL/ADSL modem) or alternatively using a cellular or satellite modem. These would additionally make use of telephone wires such as VDSL and VDSL2, coaxial cables, or fiber to the home for running fiber-optic cables directly into a house or office building, or alternatively a cellular modem or satellite dish in the latter non-fixed cases. With Internet access, the Internet service provider (ISP) would grant a single WAN-facing IP address to the network. A router is configured with the provider's IP address on the WAN interface, which is shared among all devices in the LAN by network address translation.

A gateway establishes physical and data link layer connectivity to a WAN over a service provider's native telecommunications infrastructure. Such devices typically contain a cable, DSL, or optical modem bound to a network interface controller for Ethernet. Home and small business class routers are often incorporated into these devices for additional convenience, and they often also have integrated wireless access point and 4-port Ethernet switch.

The ITU-T G.hn and IEEE Powerline standards, which provide high-speed (up to 1 Gbit/s) local area networking over existing home wiring, are examples of home networking technology designed specifically for IPTV delivery.

In addition to basic connectivity, troubleshooting Internet access on a local area network often involves verifying IP address assignment, checking the default gateway and DNS configuration, testing local network connectivity, and isolating faults between the local network, router, and Internet service provider. Common diagnostic tools include ping, traceroute, and network interface configuration utilities.

== History and development ==
=== Early installations ===
The increasing demand and usage of computers in universities and research labs in the late 1960s generated the need to provide interconnections between computer systems. A 1970 report from the Lawrence Radiation Laboratory detailing the growth of the "Octopus" network gave a good indication of the situation.

Various experimental and early commercial LAN technologies were developed in the 1970s. Ethernet was developed at Xerox PARC between 1973 and 1974. The Cambridge Ring was developed at Cambridge University starting in 1974. ARCNET was developed by Datapoint Corporation in 1976 and announced in 1977. It had the first commercial installation in December 1977 at Chase Manhattan Bank in New York. In 1979, the electronic voting system for the European Parliament was the first installation of a LAN connecting hundreds (420) of microprocessor-controlled voting terminals to a polling/selecting central unit with a multidrop bus with Master/slave (technology) arbitration. It used 10 kilometers of simple unshielded twisted pair category 3 cable—the same cable used for telephone systems—installed inside the benches of the European Parliament Hemicycles in Strasbourg and Luxembourg.

The development of personal computers in the late 1970s led to sites with dozens or hundreds of computers. The initial driving force for networking was to send messages between computer operators, followed by resource sharing. There was much enthusiasm for the concept, and for several years, from about 1983 onward, computer industry pundits habitually declared the coming year to be, "The year of the LAN".

=== Competing standards ===
In practice, the concept was marred by the proliferation of incompatible physical layer and network protocol implementations, and a plethora of methods of sharing resources. Typically, each vendor would have its own type of network card, cabling, protocol, and network operating system. A solution appeared with the advent of Novell NetWare which provided even-handed support for dozens of competing card and cable types, and a more sophisticated operating system than most of its competitors.

The 1989 survey of LAN users found that 38% used NetWare, compared to 17% IBM, 3Com 11%, AT&T Corporation 7%, 6% AppleTalk, 3% Banyan VINES, and 24% other. Of the competitors to NetWare, only Banyan had comparable technical strengths, but Banyan never gained a secure base. 3Com produced 3+Share and Microsoft produced MS-Net. These then formed the basis for collaboration between Microsoft and 3Com to create a simple network operating system LAN Manager and its cousin, IBM's LAN Server. None of these enjoyed any lasting success; Netware dominated the personal computer LAN business from early after its introduction in 1983 until the mid-1990s when Microsoft introduced Windows NT.

In 1983, TCP/IP was first shown capable of supporting actual Defense Department applications on a Defense Communication Agency LAN testbed located at Reston, Virginia. The TCP/IP-based LAN successfully supported Telnet, FTP, and a Defense Department teleconferencing application. This demonstrated the feasibility of employing TCP/IP LANs to interconnect Worldwide Military Command and Control System (WWMCCS) computers at command centers throughout the United States. However, WWMCCS was superseded by the Global Command and Control System (GCCS) before that could happen.

During the same period, Unix workstations were using TCP/IP networking. Although the workstation market segment is now much reduced, the technologies developed in the area continue to be influential on the Internet and in all forms of networking—and the TCP/IP protocol has replaced IPX, AppleTalk, NBF, and other protocols used by the early PC LANs.

Econet was Acorn Computers's low-cost local area network system, intended for use by schools and small businesses. It was first developed for the Acorn Atom and Acorn System 2/3/4 computers in 1981.

=== Further development ===
In the 1980s, several token ring network implementations for LANs were developed. IBM released its own implementation of token ring in 1985, It ran at 4 Mbit/s. IBM claimed that their token ring systems were superior to Ethernet, especially under load, but these claims were debated. By 1987 the slow but inexpensive AppleTalk was popular for Macs, but no comparable dominant PC networking hardware standard existed. IBM's implementation of token ring was the basis of the IEEE 802.5 standard. A 16 Mbit/s version of Token Ring was standardized by the 802.5 working group in 1989. IBM had market dominance over Token Ring, for example, in 1990, IBM equipment was the most widely used for Token Ring networks.

Fiber Distributed Data Interface (FDDI), a LAN standard, was considered an attractive campus backbone network technology in the early to mid 1990s since existing Ethernet networks only offered 10 Mbit/s data rates and Token Ring networks only offered 4 Mbit/s or 16 Mbit/s rates. Thus, it was a relatively high-speed choice of that era, with speeds such as 100 Mbit/s. By 1994, vendors included Cisco Systems, National Semiconductor, Network Peripherals, SysKonnect (acquired by Marvell Technology Group), and 3Com. FDDI installations have largely been replaced by Ethernet deployments.

== See also ==
- Asynchronous Transfer Mode
- Chaosnet
- LAN messenger
- LAN party
- Network interface controller
