= Basler =

Basler may refer to:

- an inhabitant or native of canton of Basel-Stadt, or canton of Basel-Landschaft, or Basel, Switzerland
- Basler (fashion), German fashion brand
- Basler (weapon), the German term for the baselard dagger
- Basler Electric, a manufacturer of power systems
- Mario Basler, (born 1968), a German former footballer
- Roy Basler, (1906-1989), American historian
- Basler BT-67, a remanufactured DC-3 aircraft produced by Basler Turbo Conversions
