= IXY =

IXY may refer to:

- IXY Digital, the Japanese name for the Canon Digital IXUS
- Kandla Airport, the IATA code for the airport in India
- IXYS Corporation
