= Zilog =

American manufacturer of microprocessors

Zilog, Inc.
- Type: Subsidiary
- Industry: Semiconductors
- Founded: 1974
- Founders: Federico Faggin; Ralph Ungermann
- Headquarters: Milpitas, California, United States
- Number of employees: 174 (2009)
- Parent: Littelfuse
- Website: zilog.com

Zilog, Inc, previously stylized as ZiLOG, is an American manufacturer of microprocessors, microcontrollers, and application-specific embedded system-on-chip (SoC) products.

The company was founded in 1974 by Federico Faggin and Ralph Ungermann, who were soon joined by Masatoshi Shima. All three had left Intel after working on the 4004 and 8080 microprocessors. The company's most famous product is the Z80 microprocessor, which played an important role in the evolution of early computing. Software-compatible with the Intel 8080, it offered a compelling alternative due to its increased performance, propelling it to widespread adoption in video game systems and home computers during the late 1970s and early 1980s.

The name, pronounced with a long "i" (/ˈzaɪlɒɡ/), is an acronym of Z integrated logic, also thought of as "Z for the last word of Integrated Logic".

== History ==
Zilog was started in California in 1974 by Federico Faggin and Ralph Ungermann with support and encouragement from Exxon's computing division. Both left Intel after working on the 4004 and 8080 microprocessors and custom chips. Masatoshi Shima, who also worked with Faggin on the 4004 and 8080, joined Zilog in 1975. Ungermann did not want the company to become an Exxon subsidiary and left Zilog in 1978.

On January 1, 1979, Zilog released the first issue of its comic book Captain Zilog, which featured the Z8000 computer. The Z8000, introduced that year, was the company's first 16-bit microprocessor.

The company became a subsidiary of Exxon in 1980. Exxon initially acquired 51 percent of the company before buying it outright; however, the management and employees bought it back in 1989, led by Edgar Sack.

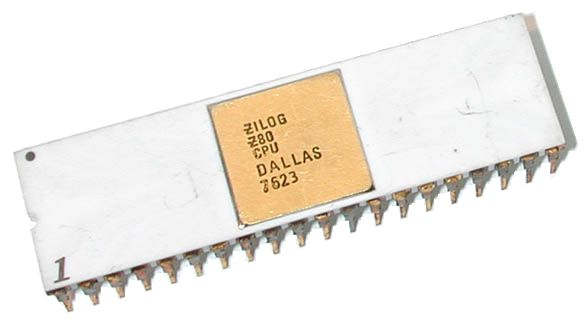
Zilog's iconic 8-bit processor, the Z80. Pictured is one of the first Z80s ever made.

Zilog went public in 1991, but was acquired in 1998 by Texas Pacific Group for $527 million. Curtis Crawford replaced Sack and changed the company's direction towards 32-bit data communications processors.

In 1999, Zilog acquired Production Languages Corporation for an unspecified amount less than $10 million.

Bonds were sold against the company to fund the new developments, but after the Internet bubble burst in 2000 and the resultant reduction in customer demand for such products, Curtis Crawford was replaced by James (Jim) Thorburn, who reorganized the company under Chapter 11 bankruptcy in late 2001 and refocused it on the 8- and 16-bit microcontroller market.

Earliest logo of Zilog
Logo of Zilog introduced in the 1990s

Jim Thorburn led Zilog back into profitability, and by FY 2007, Zilog had $82 million in sales. During this time, the company developed the Z8 Encore! 8-bit Flash MCU and ZNEO 16-bit Flash MCU product families. In February 2007, Zilog hired Darin Billerbeck to replace Jim Thorburn as president and CEO.

The last year Zilog introduced any new 8-bit microcontroller products was 2007. With no new product road map, FY2008 sales fell 20% to $67.2 million. Sales fell 46% in FY2009 to $36.2 million.

In January 2008, Zilog declined an unsolicited proposal made by Universal Electronics Inc. to acquire the company.

On February 19, 2009, Zilog announced that it had sold off its 8-bit Crimzon Universal Remote Control infrared microcontroller product line, as well as its ARM9 32-bit microcontrollers, including the Zatara security microcontrollers and 15 patents, to Maxim Integrated Products. Remote control manufacturer Universal Electronics Inc. purchased all of Zilog's software and intellectual property assets related to Zilog's universal remote control business, including all ROM code, software, and database of infrared codes. Zilog sold these assets for $31 million cash.

In December 2009, IXYS Corporation bought the company for $62.4 million in cash, which was significantly below the market valuation of Zilog's stock at the time. Details of the acquisition have been under investigation.

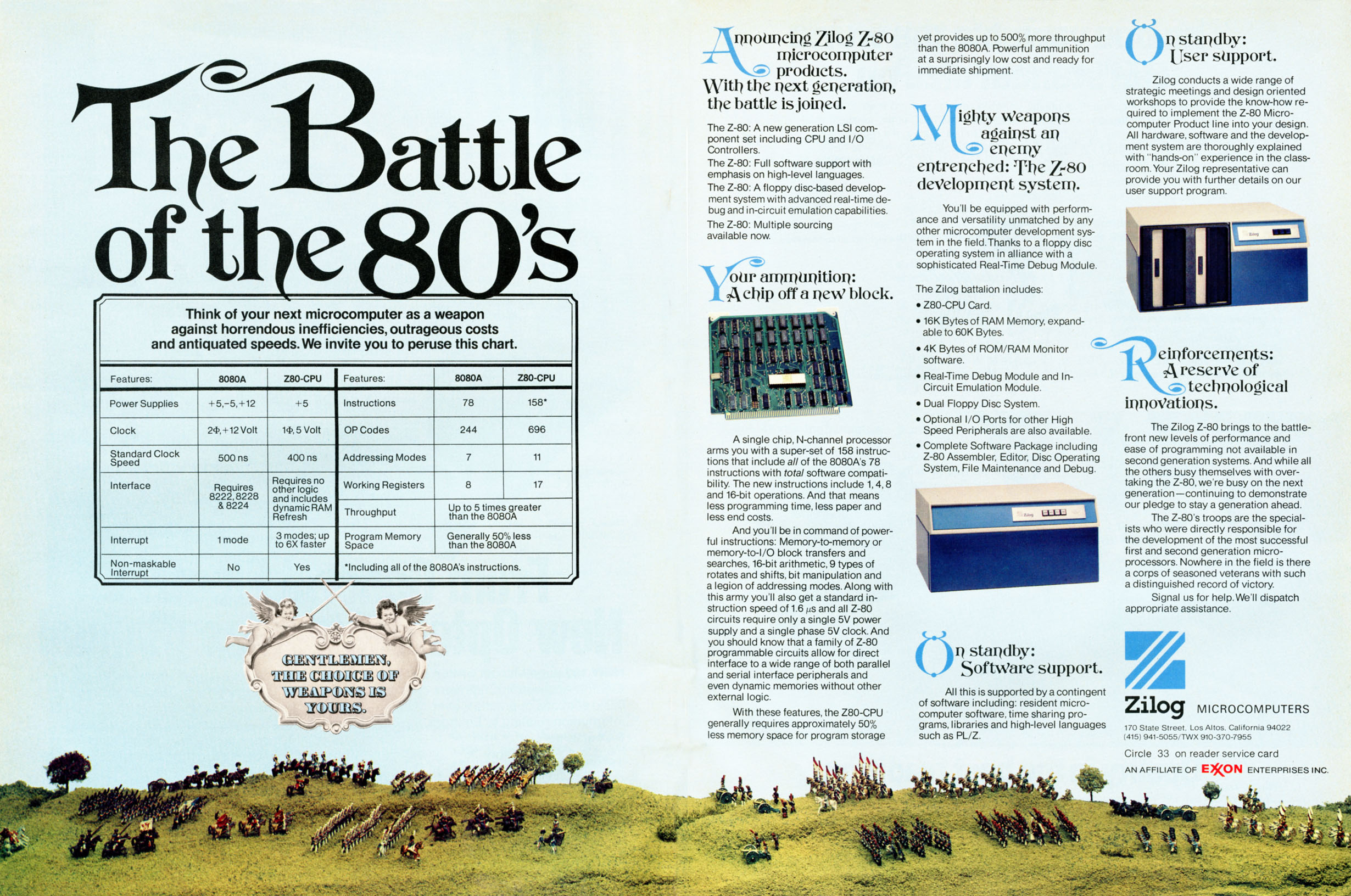
A May 1976 advertisement for the Zilog Z-80 8-bit microprocessor

Since early 2010, Zilog has refocused on the industrial and consumer markets for motion detection, motor control, RF wireless and embedded security applications, and is currently producing a number of reference designs that integrate its 8- and 16-bit microcontrollers with IXYS power management products.

In February 2012, Zilog announced the release of its Z8051 family of microcontrollers and tool sets to fill a vacancy in the developer market for 8051 cores that was created when chip-maker NXP Semiconductors exited the 8051 market. Later that year, Zilog announced its ZGATE Embedded Security solution, which incorporates its eZ80F91 MCU and TCP/IP stack with an embedded firewall to offer protection against cyber threats and attacks at the chip level.

In August 2017, Zilog and its parent IXYS Corporation were acquired by Littelfuse Inc in exchange for $750 million in cash and stocks.

== Microprocessors ==
=== Z80 ===
The Z80(i) is an improved implementation of the Intel 8080 architecture, with substantial extensions to the register model and instruction set and with added hardware interface features. Alongside the 6502, the Z80 was one of the most popular 8-bit processors for general purpose microcomputers and other applications from the late 1970s well into the 1980s, and while modern CMOS versions of the 6502 are still in production and use today, the Z80 was discontinued in 2024. The Z80 CPU was used in the Sinclair ZX80, ZX81, ZX Spectrum and the Amstrad CPC home computers as well as the MSX architecture and the Microbee and Tandy TRS-80 (models I, II, III, 4, and others). The CP/M-80 operating system (and its huge software library featuring hits like WordStar and dBase) was known to be the Z80 disk operating system, and its success is partly due to the popularity of the Z80. The 1985 Commodore 128 added a Z80 to the Commodore 64 hardware allowing it to run CP/M software; the Digital Equipment Corporation Rainbow 100 similarly added a Z80 to an Intel 8088-based MS-DOS computer to enable the machine to run both MS-DOS and CP/M software natively.

The Z80 was a common choice for creators of video games during the Golden age of arcade video games, with a Z80 powering Pac-Man, dual Z80s in Scramble, and three in each Galaga machine. It was the central processor for the ColecoVision game console (1982) and Sega's Master System (1986) and Game Gear (1990).

In the 1990s, the Z80 was the CPU of the Texas Instruments graphing calculator series, as well as being used as the secondary/support CPU in the Sega Genesis (most typically used for sound).

=== Other chips ===
After the Z80 Zilog introduced the 16-bit Z8000 and 32-bit Z80000 processors, but these were not particularly successful, and the company refocused on the microcontroller market, producing both basic CPUs and application-specific integrated circuits/standard products (ASICs/ASSPs) built around a CPU core. As well as producing processors, Zilog has produced several other components. One of the most famous was the Zilog SCC serial communications controller as found on early Apple Macintosh, Sun SPARCstations and SPARCservers up to the SPARCstation 20.

Zilog also formed a Systems Division, which designed the Zilog System 8000, a Z8000- or Z80000-based multiuser computer system running a Unix derivative called ZEUS (Zilog Enhanced UNIX System).

Zilog attempted to enter the 32-bit microcontroller market in February 2006 with the demonstration of ARM9-based Point-Of-Sale (POS) microcontroller product line. The final product was released in 2007 called Zatara. Sales were disappointing and the entire ARM9 series was sold to Maxim Integrated Products in 2009.

Zilog also produced Zdots single board computers. It includes Zilog eZ80AcclaimPlus controller, 1MB flash memory, 512KB SRAM, 10BaseT Ethernet Controller, IrDA transceiver, 2 x 60-pin system expansion interface with full MPU bus/control signals, RJ-45 Ethernet connector. Motion detection version includes Z8 Encore! XP MCU.

== Product list ==
=== Microprocessor families ===
- Zilog Z80 (1976)
- Zilog Z8000 (1979)
- Zilog Z800 (1985)
- Zilog Z80000 (late 1985)
- Zilog Z280 (early 1986)
- Zilog Z180 (late 1986)
- Zilog eZ80 (2001)

=== Microcontroller families ===
- Zilog Z380 (1994)
- Zilog Z8 (1979)
  - Zilog Z8 Encore!
  - Zilog Z8 Encore! XP
- Zilog eZ8 (2005)
- Zilog Z16F, ZNEO, 16-bit microcontroller (2006)
- Zilog Z8051 (2011)

=== Communication controllers ===
- Z8030/Z8530 SCC and Z80230/Z85230 ESCC USART chips
- Z16017/Z16M17/Z86017 PCMCIA adapter
- Z80382/Z8L382 microprocessor
- Z5380 SCSI protocol controller (based on NCR 5380)
- Z022 series single-chip modem

==== Motion detection ====
- ZEPIR0AAS02MODG - ZMOTION™ Motion Detection Module
- Z8FS040 ZMOTION™ MCU - Microcontroller with built-in motion detection algorithms
- Z8FS021A - ZMOTION™ Intrusion MCU - Microcontroller with built-in intrusion motion detection algorithms

=== Digital signal processor ===
- Z86295
- Z89 series

=== TV controllers ===
- Z90231
- Z90233
- Z90251
- Z90255

==== Line 21 decoders ====
- Z86129/Z86130/Z86131
- Z86228/Z86229/Z86230

==== Single board computers ====
- Zdots eZ80F91

=== Microcomputers ===
- MCZ 1 series
- MCZ 2 series
- ZDS series

=== Local area networking ===
- Z-Net - local networking architecture

== See also ==
- Z80-RIO
- Applied Digital Data Systems
- LaFarr Stuart, Zilog's 4th employee
