= Elektro-Apparate-Werke =

Elektro-Apparate-Werke (EAW)
- Type: Volkseigener Betrieb
- Industry: Electronics manufacturer, computer software
- Founded: October 21, 1946; 79 years ago in Berlin, German Democratic Republic
- Fate: Converted into corporation
- Headquarters: Berlin, German Democratic Republic
- Products: Electrical appliances
- Number of employees: 8000

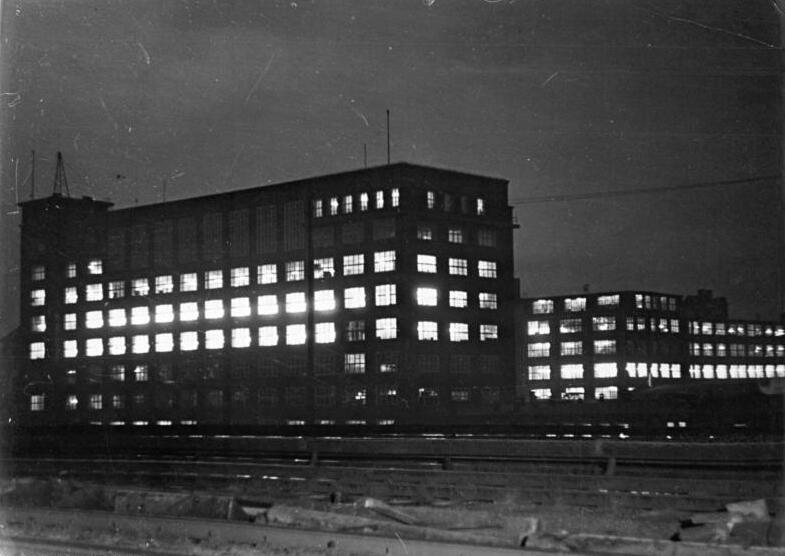
Elektro-Apparate-Werk Treptow at night (1951)

The Elektro-Apparate-Werke (EAW) was a state-owned industrial operation of the German Democratic Republic (DDR, East Germany). It was a successor of the combine VEB Elektro-Apparate-Werke (VEB) and, with more than 8000 employees, was one of the largest manufacturers of electrical appliances in the DDR.

The site of the former headquarters in the Berlin suburb of Alt-Treptow is since 1998 the location of the Treptowers, the Berlin offices of Allianz SE.

== History ==
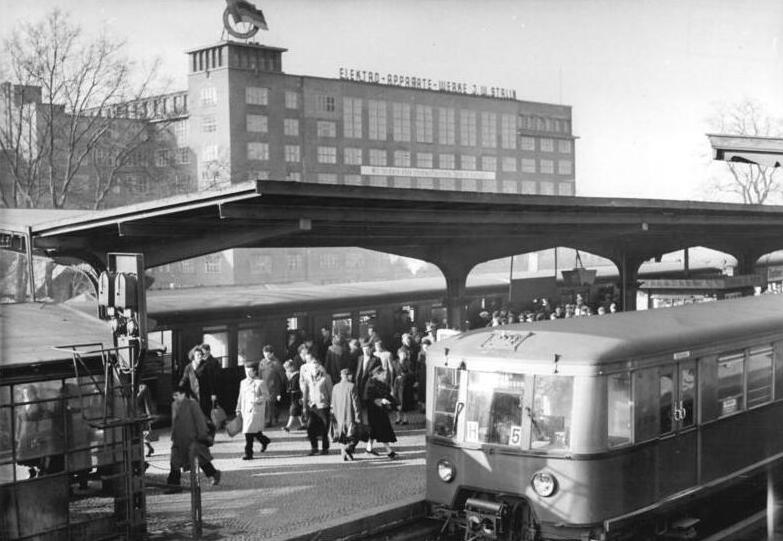
View at Berlin Treptower Park station. In the background: Elektro-Apparate-Werke J. W. Stalin (1958)

EAW originated from the Apparate-Werke Berlin-Treptow (AT), founded by AEG in 1928. During World War II the company "manufactured radio equipment for bombers and U-boats and navigational devices for V-2 rockets. Its factory [was] largely destroyed by Allied bombing raids." AT was taken over as a Soviet Aktiengesellschaft (SAG) on October 21, 1946, and renamed Elektro-Apparate-Werke Berlin-Treptow (EAW). After the death of Stalin the company was renamed Elektro-Apparate-Werke J. W. Stalin. On December 31, 1953, the works changed their legal form from an SAG to a nationally owned company (Volkseigener Betrieb) In 1960, as part of De-Stalinization, the name was changed to VEB EAW Berlin-Treptow "Friedrich Ebert", after the former socialist president of Germany. In the 1980s a memorial plaque was installed at the administration building for Communist athlete Werner Seelenbinder.

EAW also provided polytechnic training for students of neighboring schools in Treptow. The class in "Productive Work" was taught through a practical project. The water tower at the Ostkreuz station was in a poorly maintained hut, with heating problems in winter. The project taught the theory of socialist production and practical solutions of production tasks. Practical student work included the construction of indoor fountains for the people's use. A second location for the Productive work lessons was Karl Kunger Street in Treptow.

For the qualification of the employees, the EAW maintained a training school, also in Karl Kunger Street. There sales skills were taught with a focus on vocational qualification. Also annual refreshers were held for monotonous tasks of unskilled people, as in the production of refrigerator relays.

Compulsory physical education of two hours per week for the entire staff took place in company facilities inside and on the outdoor grass and gravel courts in Baumschulenweg. Also the various sports associations met there (notably the handball association) and weekly sports instruction took place.

The EAW was also a workplace and rehabilitation site for prisoners from Rummelsburg prison, not far from the relay factory on Hoffmannstraße.

In 1990, following German reunification, the organization was transformed into EAW Berlin GmbH, and was privatized in 1993. However, the company was burdened with excess employees, and a line of dated, expensive, and unreliable products. Attempts to diversify into consumer electronics and build products that could compete in the world market failed. From the former organization, independent mid-sized enterprises emerged. The EAW vocational school closed in the early 1990s.

== Products ==
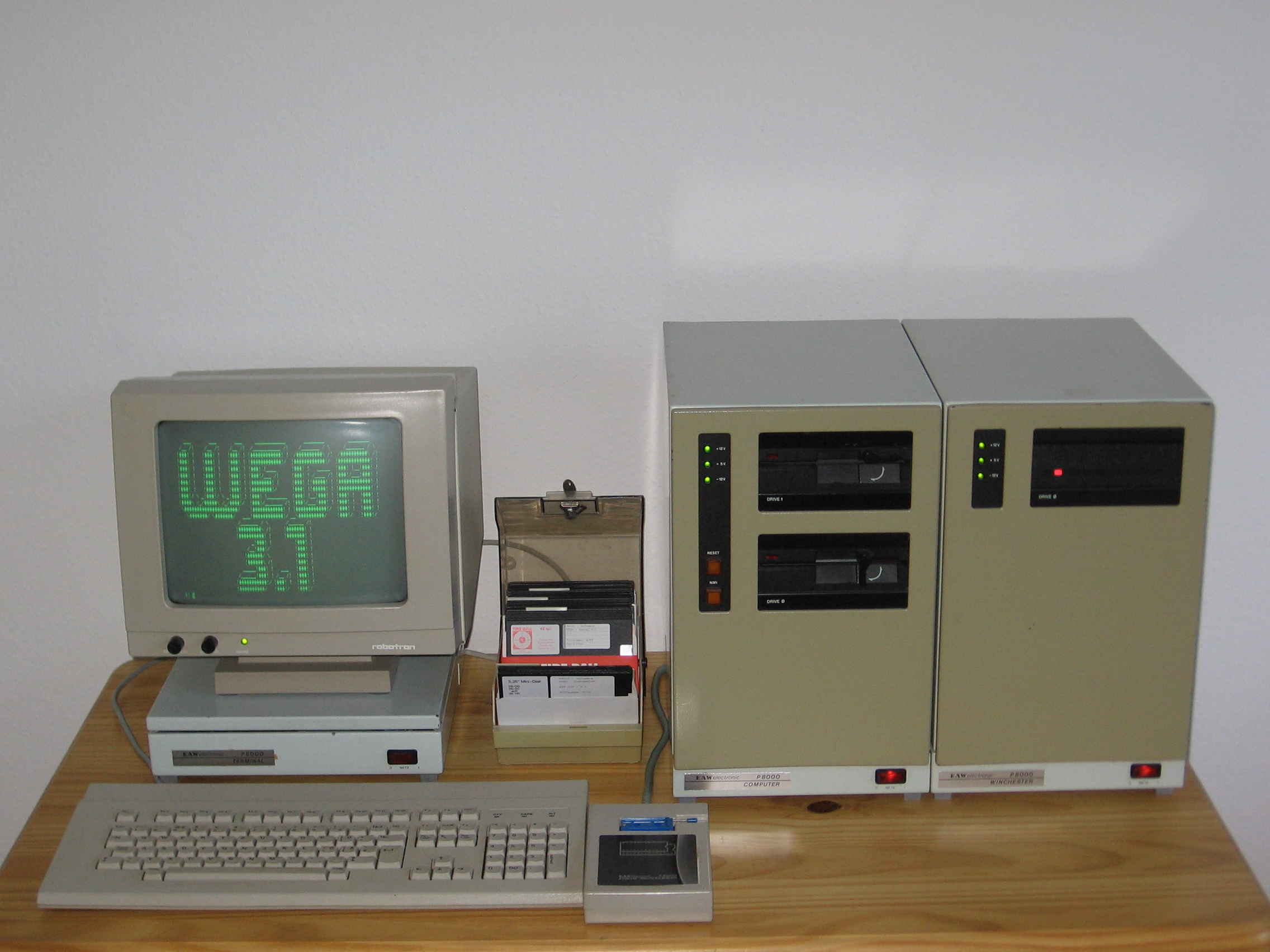
P8000 running WEGA 3.1

EAM manufactured measuring instruments, rectifiers, relays, circuit breakers, vacuum switches, instrumentation and control engineering, electric meters, radios, and computers. EAW was the manufacturer of power system distance protection equipment in East Germany. The last consumer products were the EAW AUDIO 145 stereo radio cassette recorder, the SKR 701 stereo cassette recorder, and the P8000 16-bit microcomputer, based on the East German U8000 clone of the Zilog Z8000, running a Unix clone called WEGA.
