= Z8 Encore! =

Microcontroller

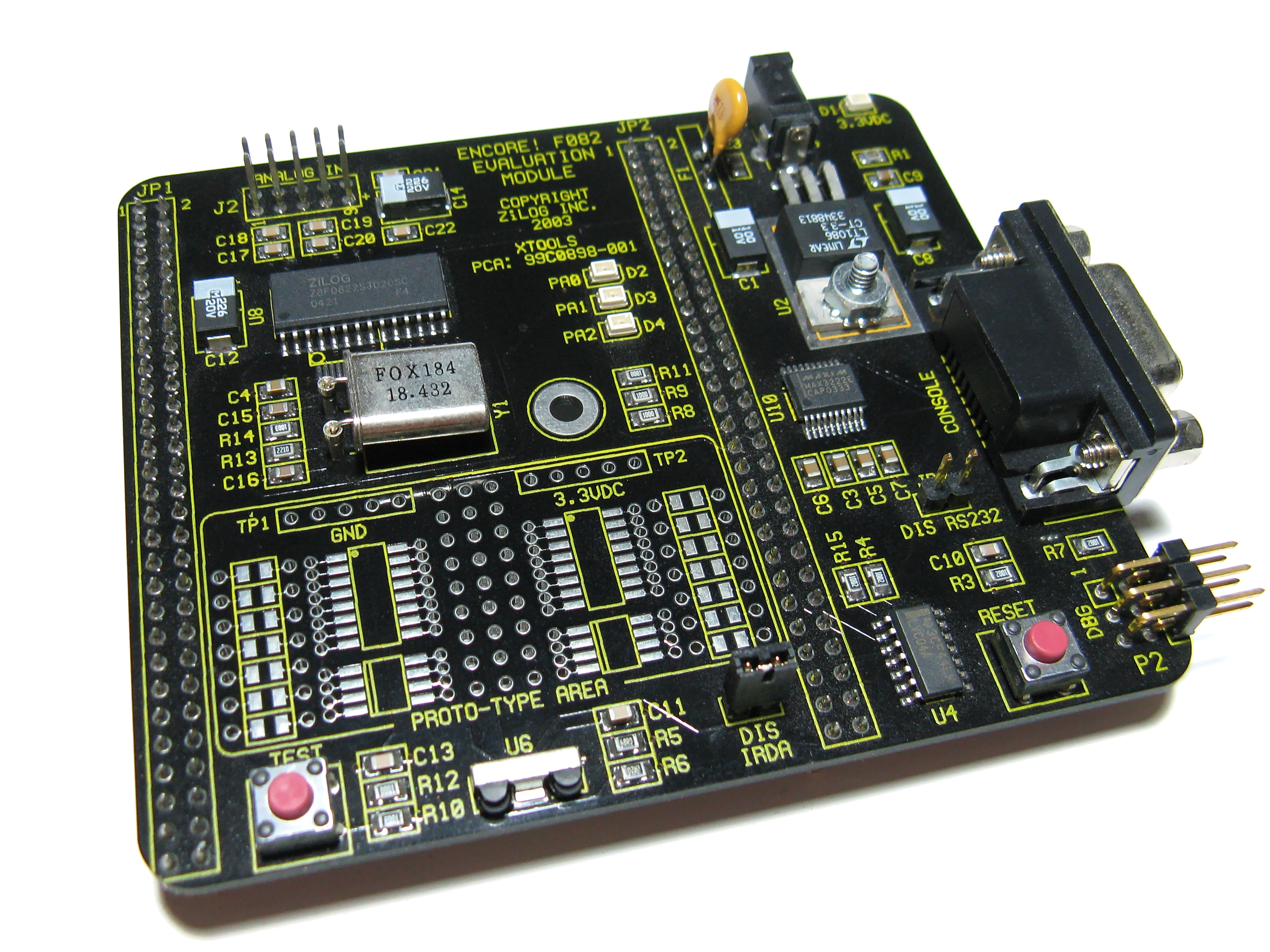
The Z8 Encore! Z8F082 development kit

The Zilog Z8 Encore! is a microcontroller based on the popular Z8 microcontroller.

The Z8 Encore! offers a wide range of features for use in embedded applications, most notably the use of three DMA channels to read for example from the analog-to-digital converter (ADC).

The Z8 Encore! instruction set is compatible with that of the Z8 but it provides some extensions for use with high-level languages.

The Z8 Encore! features a single-pin debugging interface.
