= Littelfuse =

American electronic manufacturing company

Littelfuse, Inc.
- Company type: Public
- Traded as: Nasdaq: LFUS; S&P 400 component
- Industry: Electronics, manufacturing
- Founded: 1927; 99 years ago
- Founder: Edward V. Sundt
- Headquarters: Chicago, Illinois, United States
- Key people: Gordon Hunter (chairman); Greg Henderson (CEO)
- Revenue: ▼US$2.19 billion (2024)
- Operating income: ▼US$159 million (2024)
- Net income: ▼US$100 million (2024)
- Total assets: ▼US$3.89 billion (2024)
- Total equity: ▼US$2.41 billion (2024)
- Number of employees: 16,000 (2024)
- Subsidiaries: Zilog
- Website: www.littelfuse.com

Littelfuse, Inc. is an American electronics manufacturing company headquartered in Chicago, Illinois. The company primarily produces circuit protection products (fuses) but also manufactures a variety of switches, automotive sensors and, through its subsidiary Zilog, microprocessors. Littelfuse was founded in 1927. In addition to its Chicago, Illinois, world headquarters, Littelfuse has more than 40 sales, distribution, manufacturing and engineering facilities in the Americas, Europe and Asia. Littelfuse is the developer of AutoFuse, the first blade-type automotive fuse.

== History ==
=== Early history ===
Edward V. Sundt founded Littelfuse in 1927 in Chicago, Illinois as Littelfuse Laboratories. Prior to founding Littelfuse, Sundt had worked for General Electric and Stewart-Warner, where he found diagnostic equipment frequently experienced electrical failure. Sundt developed Littelfuse's first product, a small protective fuse, to regulate current in diagnostic equipment and prevent electrical failure. When the US government refused Sundt a trademark for Little fuse (the small protective fuse) on the grounds that the words were too common, Sundt compromised by reversing the l and the e to form Littelfuse.

Littelfuse was incorporated and renamed Littelfuse, Inc. in 1938.

Littelfuse became a public company in 1962. The company retained founder Edward V. Sundt as the chairman of its board. In 1963, Littelfuse moved its headquarters from Chicago to Des Plaines, Illinois. Sundt retired in 1965 and was succeeded by Thomas Blake. Tracor purchased the company in 1968. Blake was made president of Littelfuse, which operated as a wholly owned subsidiary of Tracor.

=== 1970–1991 ===
The company expanded its manufacturing base in the 1970s with new factories opening in Watseka, Illinois and Piedras Negras, Mexico. In 1974, the company also introduced Littelites, electronic indicator lights used in industrial and office machinery, household appliances and computers.

In 1976, Littelfuse developed Autofuse, which was the first blade-type fuse used in automobiles. The Autofuse brand was counterfeited heavily and in 1983 the company obtained an exclusionary order from the United States International Trade Commission, which barred the importation of counterfeit blade-type fuses.

In 1987, Westmark Systems purchased Tracor and its Littelfuse subsidiary in a leveraged buyout. Tracor filed for bankruptcy in 1991 and spun off Littelfuse.

=== Modern history ===
Littelfuse reincorporated in November 1991 with Howard Witt as its president and CEO. Witt had worked for Littelfuse since 1979 and had been president and CEO of Littelfuse since February 1990, when the company was still owned by Tracor. In 1991, Littelfuse offered its second IPO in company history. The company's profits rose throughout the 1990s and the company expanded its operations in Europe and Asia. Littelfuse also expanded into South America with a distribution and engineering center in São Paulo, Brazil.

Gordon Hunter replaced Witt as president and CEO of Littelfuse at the end of 2004. In 2008, Littelfuse restructured its manufacturing operations, closing 16 small manufacturing plants and opening 6 new, larger plants. The company moved its headquarters from Des Plaines, Illinois, to Chicago, Illinois, the same year.

The company was recognized as Product of the Year by Consulting-Specifying Engineer in 2010, 2011, 2012 and 2013. Arrow Electronics recognized Littelfuse with an award for Supplier Excellence in 2011. The company received TTI Supplier's Excellence Award in 2010, 2011, 2012 and 2013. Littelfuse received the Chicago Innovation Award in 2012. In 2013, the company received Processing Magazine's Breakthrough Product of the Year. Littelfuse was recognized as one of the Best Places to Work in Illinois in 2012, 2013 and 2014.

The company announced in November 2016 that COO Dave Heinzmann would succeed Hunter as president and CEO in January 2017.

== Products ==
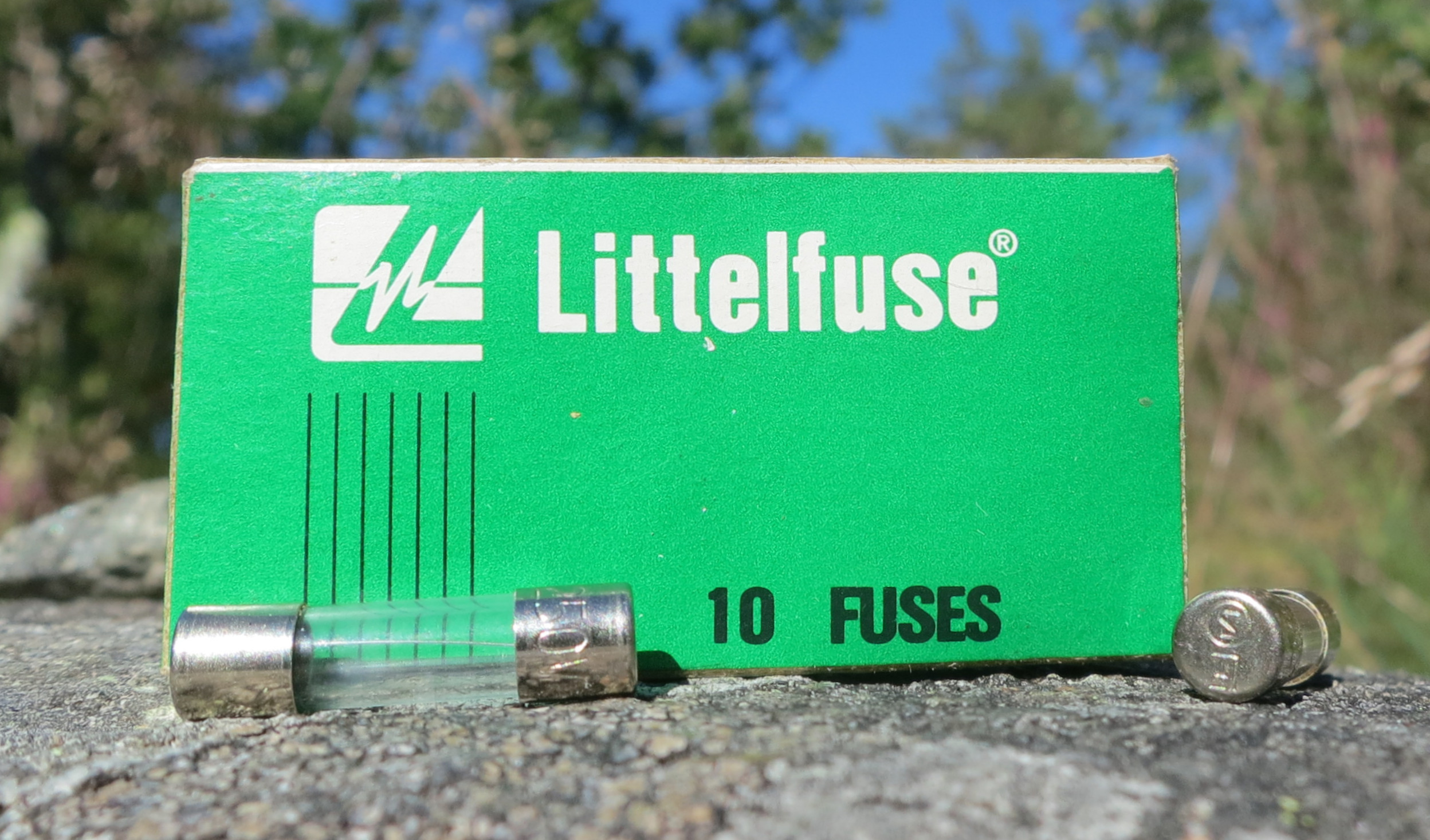
Fuses by Littelfuse

Littelfuse designs and manufactures circuit protection products for the electronics, automotive and electrical industries. The company operates between three business unit segments: Electronics, Industrial, and Automotive. Products include: fuses and protectors, suppressors, gas discharge tubes, electronic switches, solenoids, battery management devices, solid-state relays, and protective relays.

With the acquisition of Hamlin, Inc. in 2013, Littelfuse expanded its product offering to include sensors for the automotive, industrial and consumer industries.

== Acquisitions ==
Littelfuse has acquired multiple companies since 1999, including:

- 1999 – Harris Suppression Products.
- 2002 – Semitron.
- 2003 – Teccor, a manufacturer of circuit and overvoltage protection products.
- 2004 – Heinrich Industrie, a German manufacturer of circuit protection products, including the WICKMANN Group, Efen and Pudenz brands.
- 2006 – Taiwan-based silicon manufacturer Concord Semiconductor, Inc. and Catalina Performance Accessories, which manufactures and distributes blade-type automotive fuses.
- 2008 – Shock Block Corporation that develop and manufacture ground fault protection technology.
- 2008 – Startco Engineering, maker of ground-fault protection products and custom-power distribution centers that are used in industrial manufacturing and mining applications.
- 2010 – Cole Hersee, a maker of power management products, heavy duty electromechanical and switches for commercial vehicles.
- 2011 – Selco A/S, a Danish company, which produces electrical equipment for use in maritime and industrial environments.
- 2012 – Accel AB, a Swedish company that manufactures advanced automotive switches and sensors, and Terra Power Systems, which manufactures electrical components for heavy-duty vehicles and trucks.
- 2013 – Hamlin Inc., an automotive sensors manufacturer.
- 2014 – SymCom, a power, voltage, and current monitor developer and manufacturer.
- 2015 – JRS MFG. LTD., a custom engineered products developer and manufacturer, such as metal-clad, metal-enclosed, and arc-resistant switchgear, E-Houses, mine power centers and mining substations.
- 2016 – TE Connectivity's circuit protection business.
- 2016 – IGBT and TVS divisions of ON Semiconductor, a semiconductors supplier company.
- 2017 – U.S. Sensor, Manufacturer of Temperature Sensors.
- 2017 – IXYS Corp., a power semiconductor manufacturer, thereby also acquiring Zilog
- 2018 – Monolith Semiconductor Inc., a silicon carbide switch developer and manufacturer.
- 2021 – Carling Technologies Inc., a switch and electromechanical circuit breaker manufacturer.
- 2022 – C&K Switches, an electromechanical switch manufacturer
- 2023 – Western Automation Research and Development Limited, a designer and manufacturer of electrical shock protection devices.
- 2025 - Basler Electric, a designer and manufacturer of protection relays.
