= P8000 =

Microcomputer system

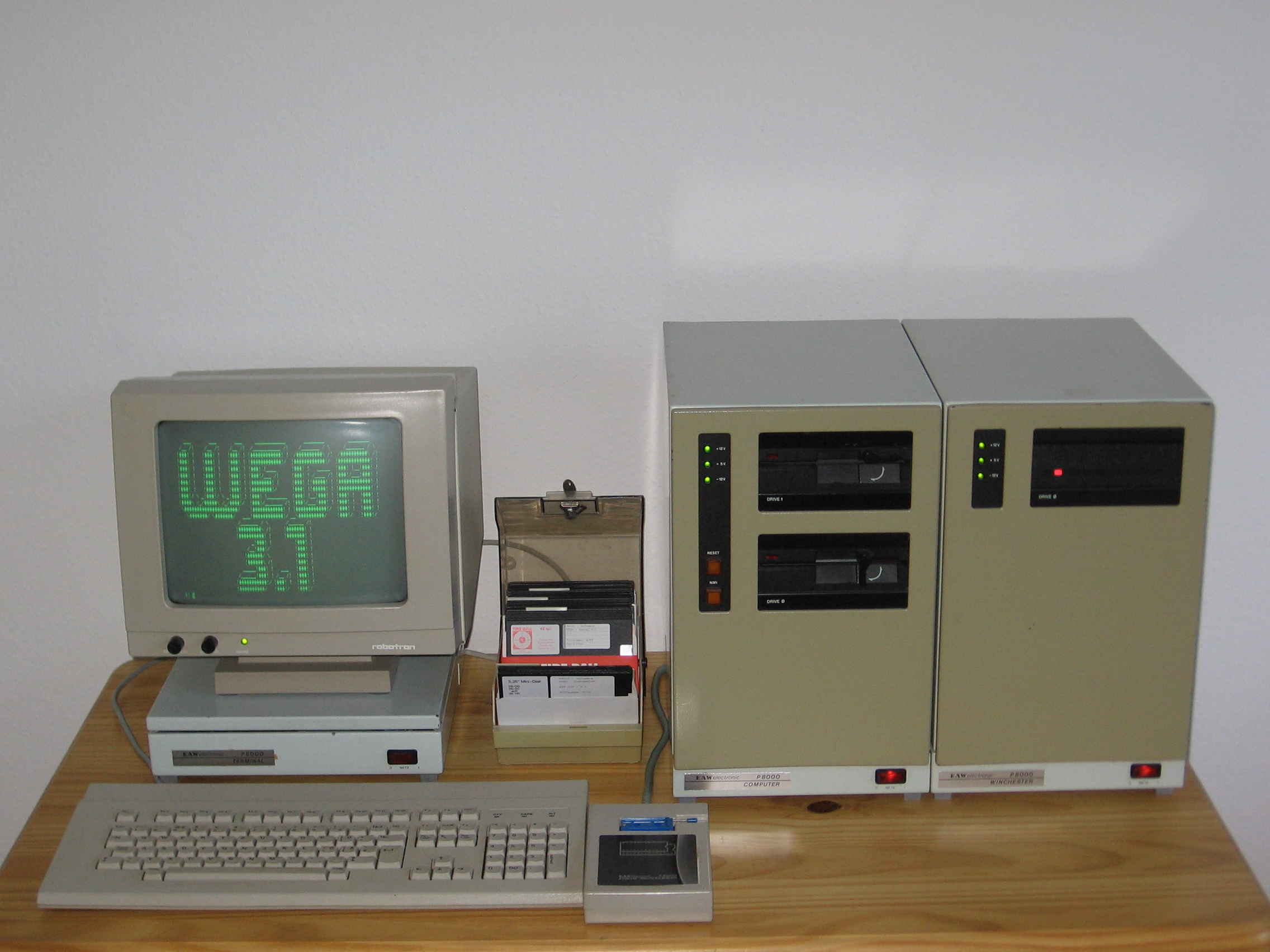
A P8000 running WEGA 3.1

The P8000 is a microcomputer system developed in 1987 by the VEB Elektro-Apparate-Werke Berlin-Treptow „Friedrich Ebert“ (EAW) in the German Democratic Republic (DDR, East Germany). It consisted of an 8-bit and a 16-bit microprocessor and a Winchester disk controller. It was intended as a universal programming and development system for multi-user/multi-task applications. The initial list price of the P8000 was 172,125 East German marks (around 86,000–172,000 DM).

There was also a budget version with only an 8-bit microprocessor.

== The 8-bit microcomputer ==
The 8-bit version of P8000 was completely contained on a single 4-layer 380-by-250-millimetre (15.0 in × 9.8 in) printed circuit board. The processor, with a clock frequency of 4 MHz, was based on the U880 microprocessor (near clone of Zilog Z80) and peripheral circuits along with the U8272 floppy-disk controller. Direct memory access was accomplished by U858 DMA controller chip.

The system featured a main memory of 64 KB dynamic RAM, an 8 K EPROM, and a 2 KB static RAM for boot code, system test routines and the system monitor. This extra memory could be moved or turned off in 4-KB-stages in the 64 K address space.

The 8-bit machine had four serial ports, designated tty0 to tty3. These interfaces could operate either as V.24 or IFSS (Interface sternförmig seriell–20 mA current loop) signals. In addition the computer had a parallel port which allowed the connection of an EPROM burner. Another internal 32-bit parallel interface was used for the coupling the 8-bit to a 16-bit microcomputer card. Data exchange was via two built-in 5.25" floppy drives. Two additional 5.25" or 8" floppy drives could be connected externally.

== The 16-bit microcomputer ==
The 16-bit version of P8000 was divided into two functional units: the 16-bit processor card and up to four plug-in memory cards with sizes of 256 KB or 1 MB. The 16-bit processor was contained on a 380-by-250-millimetre (15.0 in × 9.8 in) 6-layer PC board. The processor operated at a clock frequency of 4 MHz and was based on the U8001 (Zilog Z8001 clone) 16-bit microprocessor . Three U8010 memory management units (MMUs) augmented with special control logic handled the dynamic memory segment allocation and protected against unauthorized access. In addition the computer had 16 KB EPROM memory and 2 KB static RAM For the system Monitor and self-test routines. The peripheral circuitry was built around the U880 family. Dedicated control logic ensured the coordination with the U8001.

The 16-bit machine had four serial ports, designated tty4 to tty7. The interfaces handled both V.24 and IFSS signals. The 8-bit processor was connected to the 16-bit processor via an internal 32-bit parallel interface. Connection to the external Winchester disk was accomplished by another parallel port.

== Winchester disk controller ==
The Winchester-Disk controller (WDC) is an intelligent disk controller and was located in a separate unit, the Winchester disk enclosure. This unit contains the Winchester disk controller and up to two hard drives.

The WDC was based on the U880 microprocessor. An 8 KB EPROM stored the firmware. A 6 KB static RAM served as a buffer between the host computer to the disk . The WDC communicated with the host over an eight-bit-wide parallel interface in conjunction with additional control logic. The interface handled transmission of data blocks plus the command and acknowledgment information.

The system could support up to two identical drives using an ST-506 interface. The initial drive parameters were stored in the firmware, however with firmware version 4.2 it was possible, to use any MFM disk. From version 4.2 up the first sector of the disk stored the disk parameters in addition to bad sector information.

== The terminal ==
The P8000 terminal served as the input and output device of the P8000. It consisted of a green screen, a keyboard and a controller. The terminal could operate as an ADM-31 or VT100. It could switch between two character sets, which were stored in separate EPROMs. The interface operated in either V.24 or IFSS mode. The controller was based on a U884 and the graphics controller on o KR580WG75 (Intel 8275) chip. It used a piezoelectric speaker to issue audible alerts.

== P8000 Compact ==
Developed in 1989, the P8000 Compact was an enhanced version of the P8000. In this system the Winchester disk controller and hard drive were contained within the housing of the host computer, eliminating the extra cabinet. In contrast to the P8000, the P8000 Compact was a 16-bit system with a battery-backed real-time clock standard. Optionally the P8000 Compact was also available with a third CPU, the U80601 (Intel 80286 clone). The P8000 Compact was the last computer developed by EAW.

== Operating Systems ==
The following operating systems were available for the P8000:

- UDOS – compatible with Z80-RIO
- OS/M – compatible with CP/M
- IS/M – compatible with ISIS-II
- WEGA – compatible with UNIX
- IRTS 8000 – a real-time operating system
- DCP (only with the third CPU under WEGA ) – compatible with MS-DOS
