= IXYS =

American semiconductor company

IXYS Corporation
- Company type: Public
- Traded as: Nasdaq: IXYS
- Industry: Semiconductor
- Founded: 1983; 43 years ago
- Defunct: January 17, 2018
- Fate: Acquired by Littelfuse
- Headquarters: Milpitas, California, United States
- Key people: Nathan Zommer (CEO, chairman); Uzi Sasson (president, COO, CFO) (Dec 31, 2013)
- Revenue: US$317.21 million (2016)
- Number of employees: 1,010 (Dec 31, 2013)
- Subsidiaries: Zilog
- Website: ixys.com

IXYS Corporation is an American company based in Milpitas, California. IXYS focuses on power semiconductors, radio-frequency (RF) power semiconductors, and digital and analog integrated circuits (ICs).

== History ==
Dr. Nathan Zommer founded IXYS Corporation in 1983 in Silicon Valley, Santa Clara, California. IXYS was originally a fabless power semiconductor device company. In 1989, IXYS provided power MOSFETs for the General Motors EV1.

IXYS provided high-power IGBTs for the KTX-II high-speed train.

In 2001, the company acquired the British semiconductor manufacturer Westcode.

In December 2009, IXYS Corporation announced that it will buy Zilog, which is now the company's wholly owned subsidiary.

In July 2013, IXYS Corporation finished acquiring Samsung Electronics' 4- and 8-bit microcontroller business, and the 4- and 8-bit microcontrollers acquired from Samsung will be offered by Zilog, Inc.

In August 2017, IXYS Corporation was acquired by Littelfuse Inc in exchange for $750 million in cash and stocks.

In January 2018, Littelfuse finished acquiring IXYS Corporation and IXYS was delisted from NASDAQ.

== Products ==
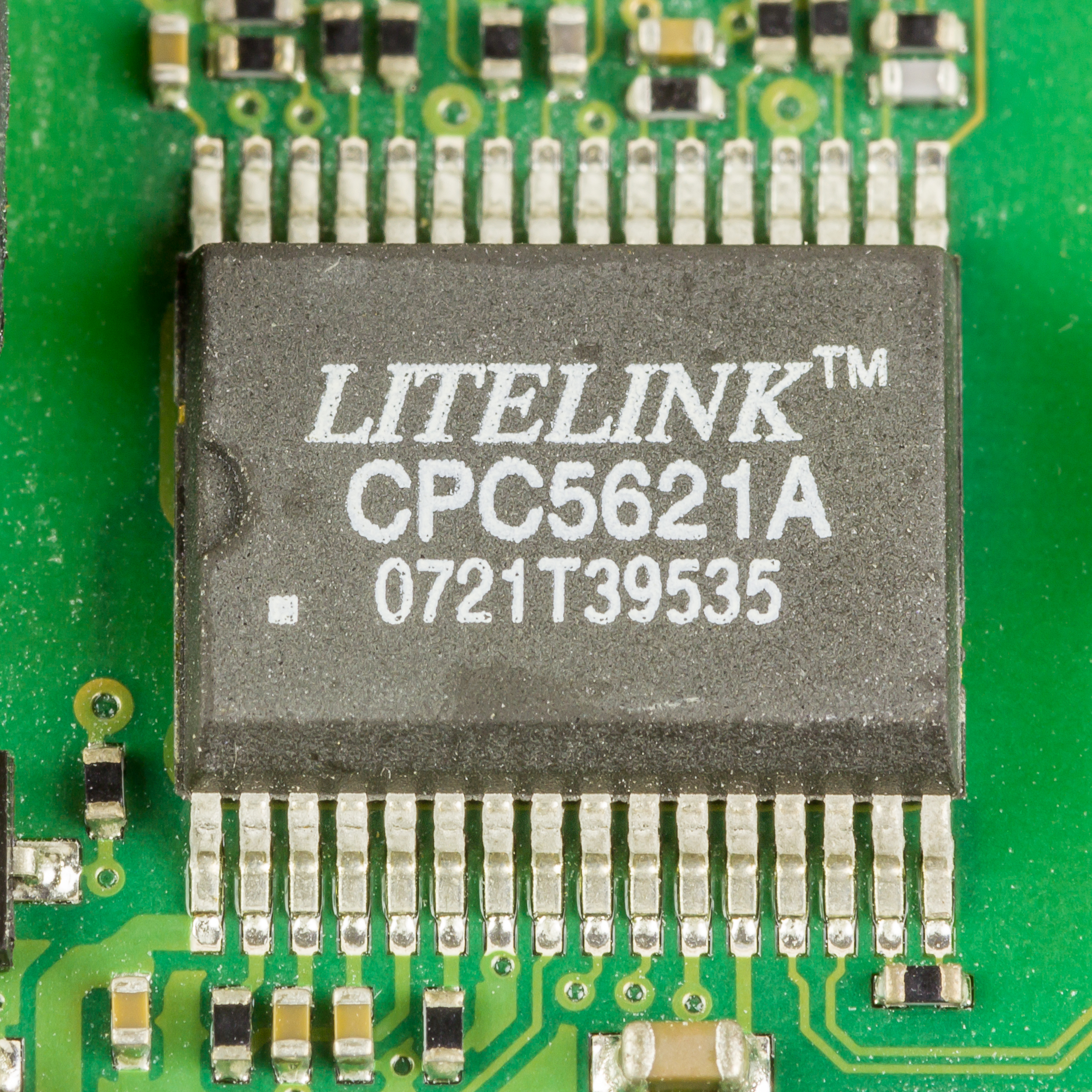
Litelink CPC5621A, a phone line interface IC (DAA)

IXYS products included MOSFETs like a 2000V N-Channel power MOSFET, designed to be used in high voltage applications as well as integrated circuits used in Solid State Relays and Line Card Access Switches. The RF Power Semiconductors convert high rates electricity for amplification or reception. In addition, IXYS provides laser diode drivers, direct copper bond (DCB).
