= Basler Electric =

American manufacturer of power systems products

Basler Electric Company
- Company type: Subsidiary
- Founded: 1942; 84 years ago
- Founder: Carl Basler
- Owner: Littelfuse (2025-present)
- Website: www.basler.com

Basler Electric is a manufacturer of power systems products based in Highland, Illinois.

Founded in 1942 by Carl Basler, it began producing custom transformers three years later; in 1959, Basler released the SRA voltage regulator. The company also manufactures solid-state and multifunction digital protective relays, generator and engine controls, and static excitation systems.

On December 11, 2025, Littelfuse announced that it had completed its acquisition of Basler Electric.

== History ==
- 1942 - The company was founded by Carl Basler.
- 1945 - start of producing custom transformers.
- 1947 - Basler Electric Company incorporation.
- 1959 - Basler introduced the first solid-state voltage regulator, the SRA.
- 1961 - Basler developed its first Static Excitation System.
- 1972 - Basler’s first solid-state relay was developed.
- 1990 - Basler International Group found in Wasselonne, France
- early 1990s - Basler started development of a Digital Excitation Control System (DECS range)
- 2004 - Basler opened facility in Suzhou China
- 2006 - Basler acquired the Cutler-Hammer Excitation Control Product Line
- 2009 - Basler opened facility in Singapore
- 2012 - Basler acquires a full-service injection molding company - Basler Plastics, LLC.
- 2017 - Basler acquires E^{2} Power Systems, LLC and expands it service capabilities to include turnkey engineering.
- 2025 - Basler was acquired by Littelfuse

== See also ==
- Electrical generators
- Relay
- Transformer
- Voltage regulator
