= Zilog Z80000 =

32-bit microprocessor

The Zilog Z80000 is an unreleased 32-bit processor designed by Zilog and completed in 1986. The Z80000 is a 32-bit expansion of the 16-bit Zilog Z8000 with multiprocessing capability, a six-stage instruction pipeline, and a 256-byte cache. It can address 4 gigabytes of RAM, but cannot execute code written for the Z8000 or Z80.

Described at the time as a "mainframe on a chip", the processor is in many ways an equivalent to Intel's 80386. Delays in the initial manufacturing pushed back its availability date to after that of the 386, and the Z80000 only made it to a test sampling phase without ever being released commercially.

== Description ==
Like the Z8000 it is based on, the Z80000 has sixteen general-purpose registers, but expanded from the Z8000's 16-bit to 32-bit. Like the Z8000, the Z80000 allows its registers to be combined, in this case using two 32-bit registers to act as a single 64-bit one. To support the Z8000s 16-bit wide data, the Z80000 can place two 16-bit values in a single 32-register.

The processor includes a memory management unit that provides protected memory, important for multitasking, and virtual memory addressing for temporary storage of RAM on a hard disk. The processor has three methods of accessing memory:

- compact mode – meant for small programs, could only access 64 KB (16-bit addresses, equivalent to the Z8000's non-segmented mode). Address bits 31-16 of all virtual addresses comes from address bits 31-16 of the program counter.
- segmented mode – 32,768 segments of 64 KB (16-bit address; comprising memory from 0-2GB) and 128 segments of 16 MB (24-bit address; comprising memory from 2GB-4GB), making a total of 4 GB (32-bit address) of accessible memory.
- linear mode – direct 4 GB (32-bit address) accessible memory

On the Z80000 CPU, interrupts are part of a category known as exceptions. This category includes resets, bus errors, interrupts, and traps.

The processor is designed to interoperate with other integrated circuits designed for use with the Z8000, such as the Zilog Z8070 floating-point coprocessor.

The Z320 was the CMOS version of the Z80000.
