= Basler (fashion) =

German fashion brand

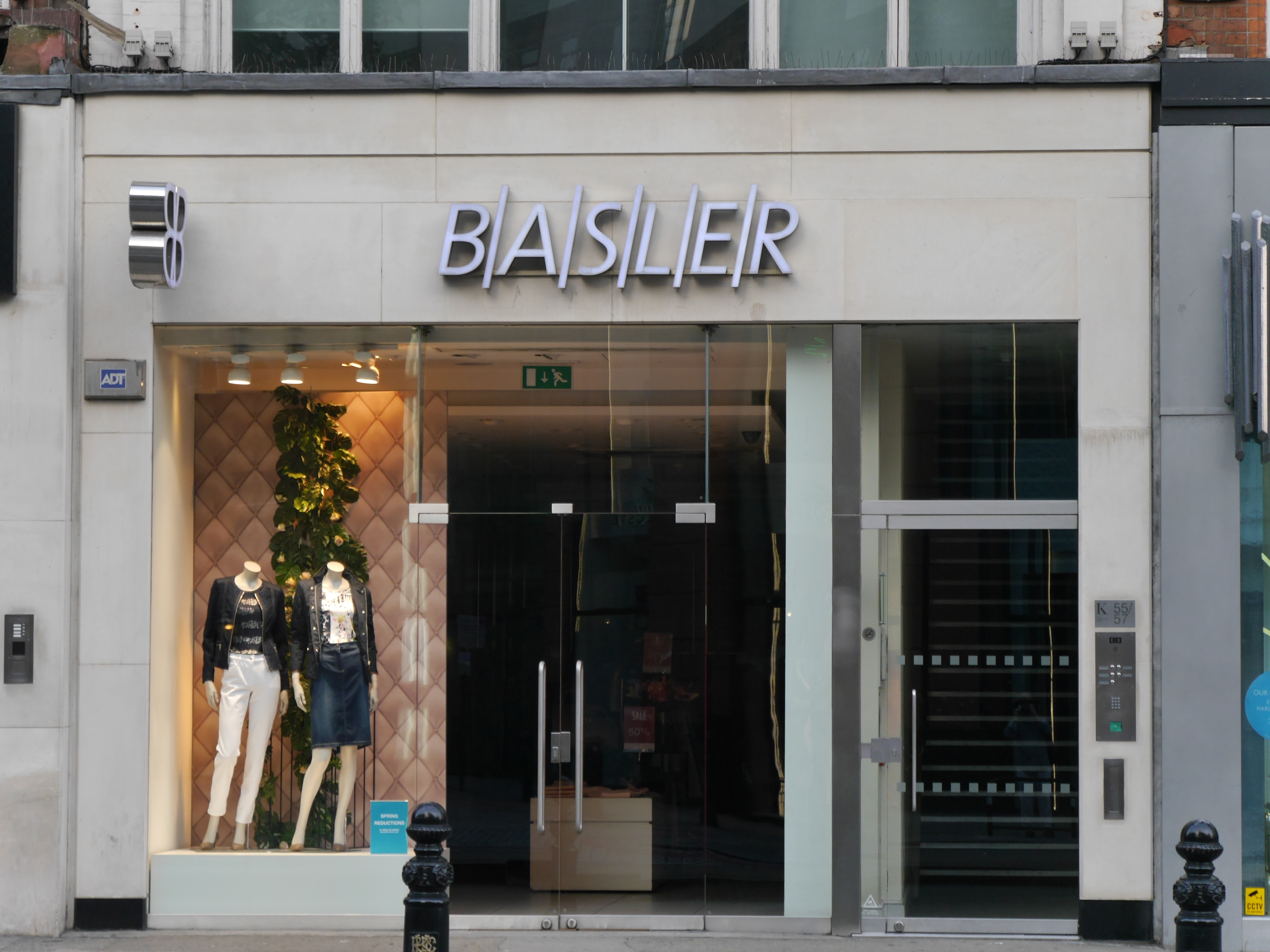
Basler store, Brompton Road, London, 2016

Basler is a German fashion brand founded in Berlin, Germany in 1936.

Fritz Basler GmbH & Co. KG was founded by Fritz Basler and his wife Elisabeth, with manufacturing in Kreuzberg, which later relocated to Berlin-Charlottenburg shortly before the end of World War II. In 1959, manufacturing moved to Aschaffenburg, Bavaria. In 1994, Luke Basler took over the business, and later expanded production into Erfurt, Thuringia. Online sales accounted for 81% of total sales in 2012.

In November 2017, German fashion company TriStyle Group acquired Basler and confirmed the closure of the brand's stores.
