= Intel 8086 =

16-bit microprocessor

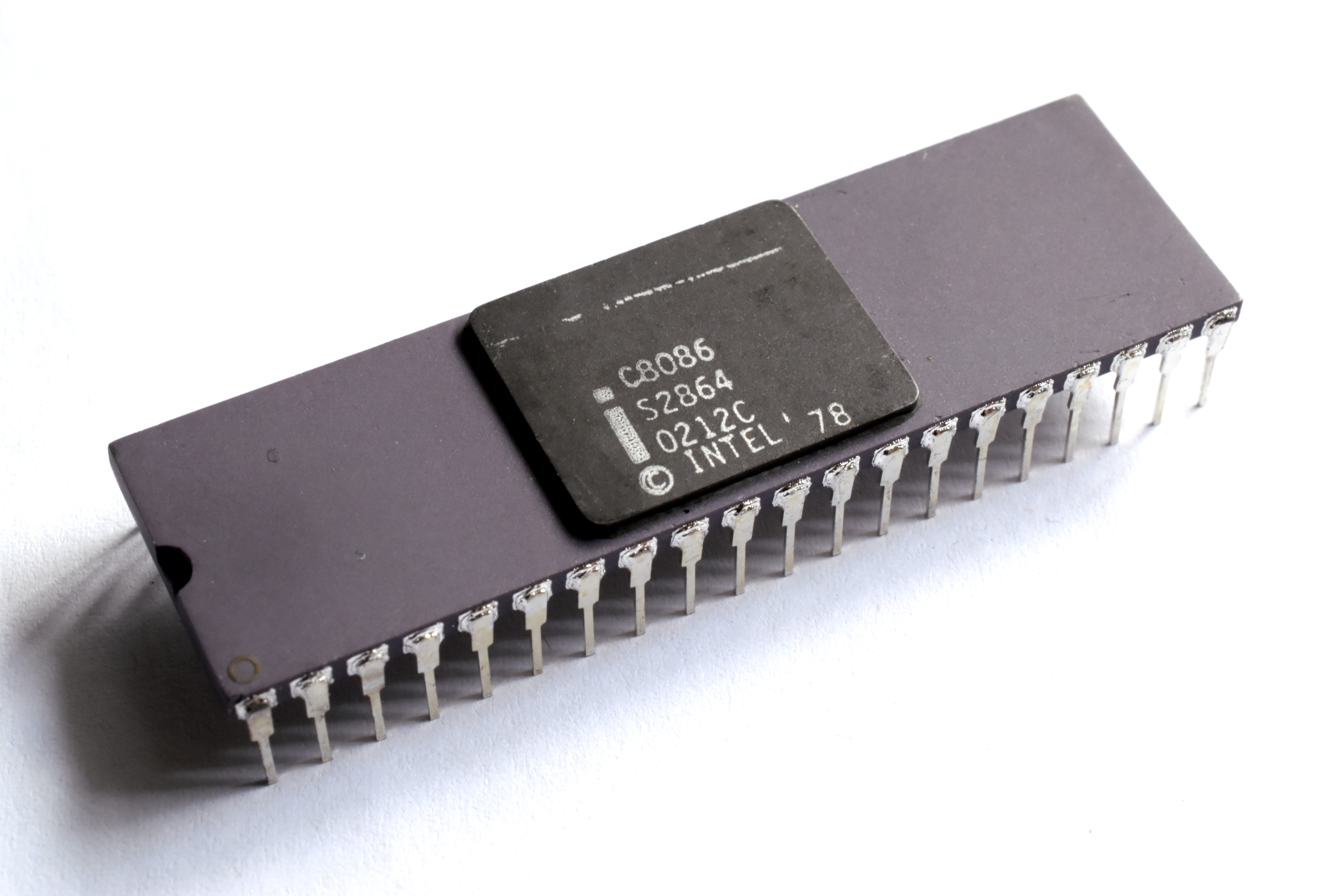
- A rare Intel C8086 processor in purple ceramic DIP package with side-brazed pins

General information
- Launched: June 8, 1978
- Discontinued: 1998
- Common manufacturer: Intel, AMD, NEC, Fujitsu, Harris (Intersil), Oki, Siemens, Texas Instruments, Mitsubishi, Panasonic

Performance
- Max. CPU clock rate: 5 MHz to 10 MHz
- Data width: 16 bits
- Address width: 20 bits

Physical specifications
- Transistors: 29,277
- Co-processor: 8087 (FPU), 8089 (I/O)
- Package: 40 pin DIP

Architecture and classification
- Technology node: 3 μm
- Instruction set: x86-16

Products, models, variants
- Variant: 8088, 80186

History
- Predecessor: 8085
- Successor: 80286

Support status
- Unsupported

The Intel 8086 ("eighty-eighty-six", also called the iAPX 86) is a 16-bit microprocessor introduced by Intel in June 1978. It established the x86 instruction set architecture (ISA), which subsequent generations of processors extended while retaining backward binary compatibility with software written for the 8086.

A derivative, the Intel 8088, was released in 1979, as a slightly modified chip with the external data bus width reduced from 16 to 8 bits, designed for use with cheaper and fewer supporting ICs. (Note: Fewer TTL buffers, latches, multiplexers (although the amount of TTL logic was not drastically reduced). It also permits the use of cheap 8080-family ICs, where the 8254 CTC, 8255 PIO, and 8259 PIC were used in the IBM PC design. In addition, it makes PCB layout simpler and boards cheaper, as well as demanding fewer (1- or 4-bit wide) DRAM chips.)

The x86 architecture later served as the basis for x86-64 and influenced the development of IA-64. The former remains the instruction set architecture used by most modern desktop and server processors. The x86 family became one of Intel's most successful product lines and is widely used in modern personal computers.

== History ==
=== Background ===
In 1972, Intel launched the 8008, Intel's first 8-bit microprocessor. (Note: using enhancement load PMOS logic (requiring 14 V, achieving TTL compatibility by having V_{CC} at +5 V and V_{DD} at −9 V).) It implemented an instruction set designed by Datapoint Corporation with programmable CRT terminals in mind, which also proved to be fairly general-purpose. The device needed several additional ICs to produce a functional computer, in part due to it being packaged in a small 18-pin "memory package", which ruled out the use of a separate address bus (Intel was primarily a DRAM manufacturer at the time).

Two years later, Intel launched the 8080, employing the new 40-pin DIL packages originally developed for calculator ICs to enable a separate address bus. It had an extended instruction set that is source-compatible (not binary compatible) with the 8008 and also included some 16-bit instructions to make programming easier. The 8080 device was eventually replaced by the depletion-load-based 8085 (1977), which used a single +5 V power supply instead of the three different operating voltages of earlier chips. (Note: Made possible with depletion-load nMOS logic (the 8085 was later made using HMOS processing, just like the 8086).) Other well known 8-bit microprocessors that emerged during these years are Motorola 6800 (1974), General Instrument PIC16X (1975), MOS Technology 6502 (1975), Zilog Z80 (1976), and Motorola 6809 (1978).

=== The first x86 design ===
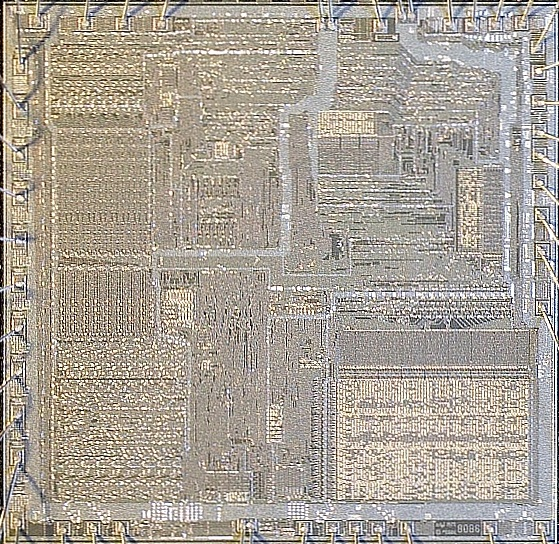
Intel 8086 CPU die image

The development of 8086 started in May 1976, originally as a temporary substitute for the ambitious yet delayed iAPX 432 project. The 8086 was an attempt to draw attention from the less-delayed 16-bit and 32-bit processors of other manufacturers — Motorola, Zilog, and National Semiconductor.

While the 8086 was a 16-bit microprocessor, it used a similar architecture as Intel's 8-bit microprocessors (8008, 8080, and 8085). This allowed assembly language programs written in 8-bit to seamlessly migrate. New instructions and features — such as signed integers, base+offset addressing, and self-repeating operations — were added. Instructions were added to assist source code compilation of nested functions in the ALGOL-family of languages, including Pascal and PL/M. According to principal architect Stephen P. Morse, this was a result of a more software-centric approach. Other enhancements included microcode instructions for the multiply and divide assembly language instructions. Designers also anticipated coprocessors, such as 8087 and 8089, so the bus structure was designed to be flexible.

The first revision of the instruction set and high level architecture was ready after about three months, (Note: Rev.0 of the instruction set and architecture was ready in about three months, according to Morse.) and as almost no CAD tools were used, four engineers and 12 layout people were simultaneously working on the chip. (Note: Using rubylith, light boards, rulers, electric erasers, and a digitizer (according to Jenny Hernandez, member of the 8086 design team, in a statement made on Intel's webpage for its 25th birthday).) The 8086 took a little more than two years from idea to working product, which was considered fast for a complex design in the 1970s.

The 8086 was sequenced (Note: 8086 used less microcode than many competitors' designs, such as the MC68000 and others) using a mixture of random logic and microcode and was implemented using depletion-load nMOS circuitry with approximately 20,000 active transistors (29,000 counting all ROM and PLA sites). It was soon moved to a new refined nMOS manufacturing process called HMOS (for High performance MOS) that Intel originally developed for manufacturing of fast static RAM products. (Note: Fast static RAMs in MOS technology (as fast as bipolar RAMs) was an important product for Intel during this period.) This was followed by HMOS-II, HMOS-III versions, and, eventually, a fully static CMOS version for battery powered devices, manufactured using Intel's CHMOS processes. (Note: CHMOS is Intel's name for CMOS circuits manufactured using processing steps very similar to HMOS.) The original chip measured 33 mm² and minimum feature size was 3.2 μm. The MUL and DIV instructions were very slow due to being microcoded so x86 programmers usually just used the bit shift instructions for multiplying and dividing instead.

The 8086 was die-shrunk to 2 μm in 1981; this version also corrected a stack register bug in the original 3.5 μm chips. Later 1.5 μm and CMOS variants were outsourced to other manufacturers and not developed in-house.

The architecture was defined by Stephen P. Morse with some help from Bruce Ravenel (the architect of the 8087) in refining the final revisions. Logic designer Jim McKevitt and John Bayliss were the lead engineers of the hardware-level development team (Note: Other members of the design team were Peter A. Stoll and Jenny Hernandez.) and Bill Pohlman the manager for the project. The legacy of the 8086 is enduring in the basic instruction set of today's personal computers and servers; the 8086 also lent its last two digits to later extended versions of the design, such as the Intel 286 and the Intel 386, all of which eventually became known as the x86 family. In addition, the PCI Vendor ID for system devices produced by Intel is 8086.

== Details ==
The 8086 pin assignments in min and max mode

=== Buses and operation ===
All internal registers, as well as internal and external data buses, are 16 bits wide, which firmly established the "16-bit microprocessor" identity of the 8086. A 20-bit external address bus provides a 1 MiB physical address space (2^{20} = 1,048,576 x 1 byte). This address space is addressed by means of internal memory "segmentation". The data bus is multiplexed with the address bus in order to fit all of the control lines into a standard 40-pin dual in-line package. It provides a 16-bit I/O address bus, supporting 64 KB of separate I/O space. The maximum linear address space is limited to 64 KB, simply because internal address/index registers are only 16 bits wide. Programming over 64 KB memory boundaries involves adjusting the segment registers (see below); this difficulty existed until the 80386 architecture introduced wider (32-bit) registers (the memory management hardware in the 80286 did not help in this regard, as its registers are still only 16 bits wide).

=== Hardware modes of 8086 ===
Some of the control pins, which carry essential signals for all external operations, have more than one function depending upon whether the device is operated in min or max mode. The former mode is intended for small single-processor systems, while the latter is for medium or large systems using more than one processor (a kind of multiprocessor mode). Maximum mode is required when using an 8087 or 8089 coprocessor. The voltage on pin 33 (MN/M̅X̅) determines the mode. Changing the state of pin 33 changes the function of certain other pins, most of which have to do with how the CPU handles the (local) bus. (Note: The IBM PC and PC/XT use an Intel 8088 running in maximum mode, which allows the CPU to work with an optional 8087 coprocessor installed in the math coprocessor socket on the PC or PC/XT mainboard. (The PC and PC/XT may require maximum mode for other reasons, such as perhaps to support the DMA controller.)) The mode is usually hardwired into the circuit and therefore cannot be changed by software. The workings of these modes are described in terms of timing diagrams in Intel datasheets and manuals. In minimum mode, all control signals are generated by the 8086 itself.

=== Registers and instruction ===
Intel 8086 registers
^{1}_{9}	^{1}_{8}	^{1}_{7}	^{1}_{6}	^{1}_{5}	^{1}_{4}	^{1}_{3}	^{1}_{2}	^{1}_{1}	^{1}_{0}	^{0}_{9}	^{0}_{8}	^{0}_{7}	^{0}_{6}	^{0}_{5}	^{0}_{4}	^{0}_{3}	^{0}_{2}	^{0}_{1}	^{0}_{0}	(bit position)
Main registers
				AH								AL								AX (accumulator)
				CH								CL								CX (counter)
				DH								DL								DX (extended acc)
0 0 0 0				BH								BL								BX (base)
Index registers
0 0 0 0				SP																Stack Pointer
0 0 0 0				BP																Base Pointer
0 0 0 0				SI																Source Index
0 0 0 0				DI																Destination Index
Program counter
0 0 0 0				IP																Instruction Pointer
Segment registers
ES																0 0 0 0				Extra Segment
CS																0 0 0 0				Code Segment
SS																0 0 0 0				Stack Segment
DS																0 0 0 0				Data Segment
Status register
				-	-	-	-	O	D	I	T	S	Z	-	A	-	P	-	C	Flags

The 8086 has eight more-or-less general 16-bit registers (including the stack pointer but excluding the instruction pointer, flag register and segment registers). Four of them, AX, BX, CX, DX, can also be accessed as 8-bit register pairs (see figure) while the other four, SI, DI, BP, SP, are 16-bit only.

Due to a compact encoding inspired by 8-bit processors, most instructions are one-address or two-address operations, which means that the result is stored in one of the operands. At most one of the operands can be in memory, but this memory operand can also be the destination, while the other operand, the source, can be either register or immediate. A single memory location can also often be used as both source and destination which, among other factors, further contributes to a code density comparable to (and often better than) most eight-bit machines at the time.

The degree of generality of most registers is much greater than in the 8080 or 8085. However, 8086 registers were more specialized than in most contemporary minicomputers and are also used implicitly by some instructions. While perfectly sensible for the assembly programmer, this makes register allocation for compilers more complicated compared to more orthogonal 16-bit and 32-bit processors of the time such as the PDP-11, VAX, 68000, 32016, etc. On the other hand, being more regular than the rather minimalistic but ubiquitous 8-bit microprocessors such as the 6502, 6800, 6809, 8085, MCS-48, 8051, and other contemporary accumulator-based machines, it is significantly easier to construct an efficient code generator for the 8086 architecture.

Another factor for this is that the 8086 also introduced some new instructions (not present in the 8080 and 8085) to better support stack-based high-level programming languages such as Pascal and PL/M; some of the more useful instructions are push mem-op, and ret size, supporting the "Pascal calling convention" directly. (Several others, such as push immed and enter, were added in the subsequent 80186, 80286, and 80386 processors.)

A 64 KB (one segment) stack growing towards lower addresses is supported in hardware; 16-bit words are pushed onto the stack, and the top of the stack is pointed to by SS:SP. There are 256 interrupts, which can be invoked by both hardware and software. The interrupts can cascade, using the stack to store the return addresses.

The 8086 has 64 K of 8-bit (or alternatively 32 K of 16-bit word) I/O port space.

=== Flags ===
The 8086 has a 16-bit flags register. Nine of these condition code flags are active, and indicate the current state of the processor: Carry flag (CF), Parity flag (PF), Auxiliary carry flag (AF), Zero flag (ZF), Sign flag (SF), Trap flag (TF), Interrupt flag (IF), Direction flag (DF), and Overflow flag (OF). Also referred to as the status word, the layout of the flags register is as follows:

Bit	15-12	11	10	9	8	7	6	5	4	3	2	1	0
Flag		OF	DF	IF	TF	SF	ZF		AF		PF		CF

=== Segmentation ===
There are also four 16-bit segment registers (see figure) that allow the 8086 CPU to access one megabyte of memory in an unusual way. Rather than concatenating the segment register with the address register, as in most processors whose address space exceeds their register size, the 8086 shifts the 16-bit segment four bits left before adding it to the 16-bit offset (16×segment + offset), therefore producing a 20-bit external (or effective or physical) address from the 32-bit segment:offset pair. As a result, any external address could be referred to by up to 2^{12} = 4096 different segment:offset pairs.

0110 1000 1000 01110000	Segment,	16 bits, shifted 4 bits left (or multiplied by 0x10)
+ 1011 0100 1010 1001	Offset,	16 bits
0111 0011 1101 0001 1001	Address,	20 bits

Although considered complicated and cumbersome by many programmers, this scheme also has advantages; a small program (less than 64 KB) can be loaded starting at a fixed offset (such as 0000) in its own segment, avoiding the need for relocation, with at most 15 bytes of alignment waste.

Compilers for the 8086 family commonly support two types of pointer, near and far. Near pointers are 16-bit offsets implicitly associated with the program's code or data segment and so can be used only within parts of a program small enough to fit in one segment. Far pointers are 32-bit segment:offset pairs resolving to 20-bit external addresses. Some compilers also support huge pointers, which are like far pointers except that pointer arithmetic on a huge pointer treats it as a linear 20-bit pointer, while pointer arithmetic on a far pointer wraps around within its 16-bit offset without touching the segment part of the address.

To avoid the need to specify near and far on numerous pointers, data structures, and functions, compilers also support "memory models" which specify default pointer sizes. The tiny (max 64K), small (max 128K), compact (data > 64K), medium (code > 64K), large (code,data > 64K), and huge (individual arrays > 64K) models cover practical combinations of near, far, and huge pointers for code and data. The tiny model means that code and data are shared in a single segment, just as in most 8-bit based processors, and can be used to build .com files for instance. Precompiled libraries often come in several versions compiled for different memory models.

According to Morse et al.,. the designers actually contemplated using an 8-bit shift (instead of 4-bit), in order to create a 16 MB physical address space. However, as this would have forced segments to begin on 256-byte boundaries, and 1 MB was considered very large for a microprocessor around 1976, the idea was dismissed. Also, there were not enough pins available on a low cost 40-pin package for the additional four address bus pins.

In principle, the address space of the x86 series could have been extended in later processors by increasing the shift value, as long as applications obtained their segments from the operating system and did not make assumptions about the equivalence of different segment:offset pairs. (Note: Some 80186 clones did change the shift value, but were never commonly used in desktop computers.) In practice the use of "huge" pointers and similar mechanisms was widespread and the flat 32-bit addressing made possible with the 32-bit offset registers in the 80386 eventually extended the limited addressing range in a more general way.

The instruction stream is fetched from memory as words and is addressed internally by the processor to the byte level as necessary. An instruction stream queuing mechanism allows up to 6 bytes of the instruction stream to be queued while waiting for decoding and execution. The queue acts as a first-in-first-out (FIFO) buffer, from which the Execution Unit (EU) extracts instruction bytes as required. Whenever there is space for at least two bytes in the queue, the BIU will attempt a word fetch memory cycle. If the queue is empty (following a branch instruction, for example), the first byte into the queue immediately becomes available to the EU.

==== Porting older software ====
Small programs could ignore the segmentation and just use plain 16-bit addressing. This allows 8-bit software to be easily ported to the 8086. MS-DOS took advantage of this by providing an Application Programming Interface very similar to CP/M as well as including the simple .com executable file format, identical to CP/M. This was important when the 8086 and MS-DOS were new, because it allowed many existing CP/M (and other) applications to be quickly made available, greatly easing acceptance of the new platform.

=== Interrupts ===
Format of the 8086's interrupt vector table

Interrupts on the 8086 can be either software or hardware-initiated. Interrupts are long calls that also save the processor status. Interrupt routines typically end with a IRET instruction. All interrupts have a 8-bit interrupt number associated with them. This number is used to look up a segment:offset in a 256 element interrupt vector table stored at addresses 0-3FFH. When any type of interrupt is encountered, the processor status is pushed, CS and IP are pushed, and the interrupt number is multiplied by four to index a new execution address which is loaded from the vector table.

There are three types of software interrupt instructions: INT n, INTO, and a single-byte INT 3 used for debugging.

There are two kinds of hardware interrupts: maskable and non-maskable.

Non-maskable interrupts are higher priority than maskable interrupts. They cannot be disabled by interrupt enable. A low to high transition on the NMI pin essentially causes an INT 2 to execute.

Maskable interrupts are enabled and disabled by the STI and CLI instructions respectively. When the INTR is asserted by a hardware device, the 8086 asserts INTA twice, reading an 8-bit interrupt number from the bus. This number is multiplied by four to point to the associated interrupt service routine address in the vector table. Maskable interrupts are disabled when INTA is asserted, but are re-enabled upon executing the IRET instruction at the end of the interrupt service routine.

== Example code ==
The following 8086 assembly source code is for a subroutine named _strtolower that copies a null-terminated ASCIIZ character string from one location to another, converting all alphabetic characters to lower case. The string is copied one byte (8-bit character) at a time.

0000            
0000  55
0001  89 E5
0003  56
0004  57
0005  8B 75 06
0008  8B 7D 04
000B  FC

000C  AC
000D  3C 41
000F  7C 06
0011  3C 5A
0013  7F 02
0015  04 20
0017  AA
0018  08 C0
001A  75 F0

001C  5F
001D  5E
001E  5D
001F  C3
001F 

; _strtolower:
; Copy a null-terminated ASCII string, converting
; all alphabetic characters to lower case.
; ES=DS
; Entry stack parameters
;   [SP+4] = src, Address of source string
;   [SP+2] = dst, Address of target string
;   [SP+0] = Return address
;
_strtolower proc
            push    bp              ;Set up the call frame
            mov     bp,sp
            push    si
            push    di
            mov     si,[bp+6]       ;Set si = src (+2 due to push bp)
            mov     di,[bp+4]       ;Set di = dst
            cld                     ;string direction ascending
            
loop:       lodsb                   ;Load al from [si], inc si
            cmp     al,'A'          ;If al < 'A',
            jl      copy            ; skip conversion
            cmp     al,'Z'          ;If al > 'Z',
            jg      copy            ; skip conversion
            add     al,'a'-'A'      ;Convert al to lowercase
copy:       stosb                   ;Store al to es:[di], inc di
            or      al,al           ;If al <> 0,
            jne     loop            ; repeat the loop
            
done:       pop     di              ;restore di and si
            pop     si
            pop     bp              ;Restore the prev call frame
            ret                     ;Return to caller
            end     proc

The example code uses the BP (base pointer) register to establish a call frame, an area on the stack that contains all of the parameters and local variables for the execution of the subroutine. This kind of calling convention supports reentrant and recursive code and has been used by Algol-like languages since the late 1950s. A flat memory model is assumed, specifically, that the DS and ES segments address the same region of memory.

=== Performance ===
Simplified block diagram over Intel 8088 (a variant of 8086); 1=main & index registers; 2=segment registers and IP; 3=address adder; 4=internal address bus; 5=instruction queue; 6=control unit (very simplified!); 7=bus interface; 8=internal databus; 9=ALU; 10/11/12=external address/data/control bus.

Although partly shadowed by other design choices in this particular chip, the multiplexed address and data buses limit performance slightly; transfers of 16-bit or 8-bit quantities are done in a four-clock memory access cycle, which is faster on 16-bit, although slower on 8-bit quantities, compared to many contemporary 8-bit based CPUs. As instructions vary from one to six bytes, fetch and execution are made concurrent and decoupled into separate units (as it remains in today's x86 processors): The bus interface unit feeds the instruction stream to the execution unit through a 6-byte prefetch queue (a form of loosely coupled pipelining), speeding up operations on registers and immediates, while memory operations became slower (four years later, this performance problem was fixed with the 80186 and 80286). However, the full (instead of partial) 16-bit architecture with a full-width ALU meant that 16-bit arithmetic instructions could now be performed with a single ALU cycle (instead of two, via internal carry, as in the 8080 and 8085), speeding up such instructions considerably. Combined with orthogonalizations of operations versus operand types and addressing modes, as well as other enhancements, this made the performance gain over the 8080 or 8085 fairly significant, despite cases where the older chips may be faster (see below).

Execution times for typical instructions (in clock cycles)
instruction	register-register	register immediate	register-memory	memory-register	memory-immediate
mov	2	4	8+EA	9+EA	10+EA
ALU	3	4	9+EA,	16+EA,	17+EA
jump	register ≥ 11 ; label ≥ 15 ; condition,label ≥ 16				
integer multiply	70~160 (depending on operand data as well as size) including any EA				
integer divide	80~190 (depending on operand data as well as size) including any EA				

- EA = time to compute effective address, ranging from 5 to 12 cycles.
- Timings are best case, depending on prefetch status, instruction alignment, and other factors.

As can be seen from these tables, operations on registers and immediates were fast (between 2 and 4 cycles), while memory-operand instructions and jumps were quite slow; jumps took more cycles than on the simple 8080 and 8085, and the 8088 (used in the IBM PC) was additionally hampered by its narrower bus. The reasons why most memory related instructions were slow were threefold:

- Loosely coupled fetch and execution units are efficient for instruction prefetch, but not for jumps and random data access (without special measures).
- No dedicated address calculation adder was afforded; the microcode routines had to use the main ALU for this (although there was a dedicated segment + offset adder).
- The address and data buses were multiplexed, forcing a slightly longer (33~50%) bus cycle than in typical contemporary 8-bit processors.

However, memory access performance was drastically enhanced with Intel's next generation of 8086 family CPUs. The 80186 and 80286 both had dedicated address calculation hardware, saving many cycles, and the 80286 also had separate (non-multiplexed) address and data buses.

=== Floating point ===
The 8086/8088 could be connected to a mathematical coprocessor to add hardware/microcode-based floating-point performance. The Intel 8087 was the standard math coprocessor for the 8086 and 8088, operating on 80-bit numbers. Manufacturers like Cyrix (8087-compatible) and Weitek (not 8087-compatible) eventually came up with high-performance floating-point coprocessors that competed with the 8087.

== Chip versions ==
The clock frequency was originally limited to 5 MHz, (Note: (IBM PC used 4.77 MHz, 4/3 the standard NTSC color burst frequency)) but the last versions in HMOS were specified for 10 MHz. HMOS-III and CMOS versions were manufactured for a long time (at least a while into the 1990s) for embedded systems, although its successor, the 80186/80188 (which includes some on-chip peripherals), has been more popular for embedded use.

The 80C86, the CMOS version of the 8086, was used in many portable computers and embedded systems, including the GridPad, Toshiba T1200, HP 110, and finally the 1998–1999 Lunar Prospector.

For the packaging, the Intel 8086 was available both in ceramic and plastic DIP packages.

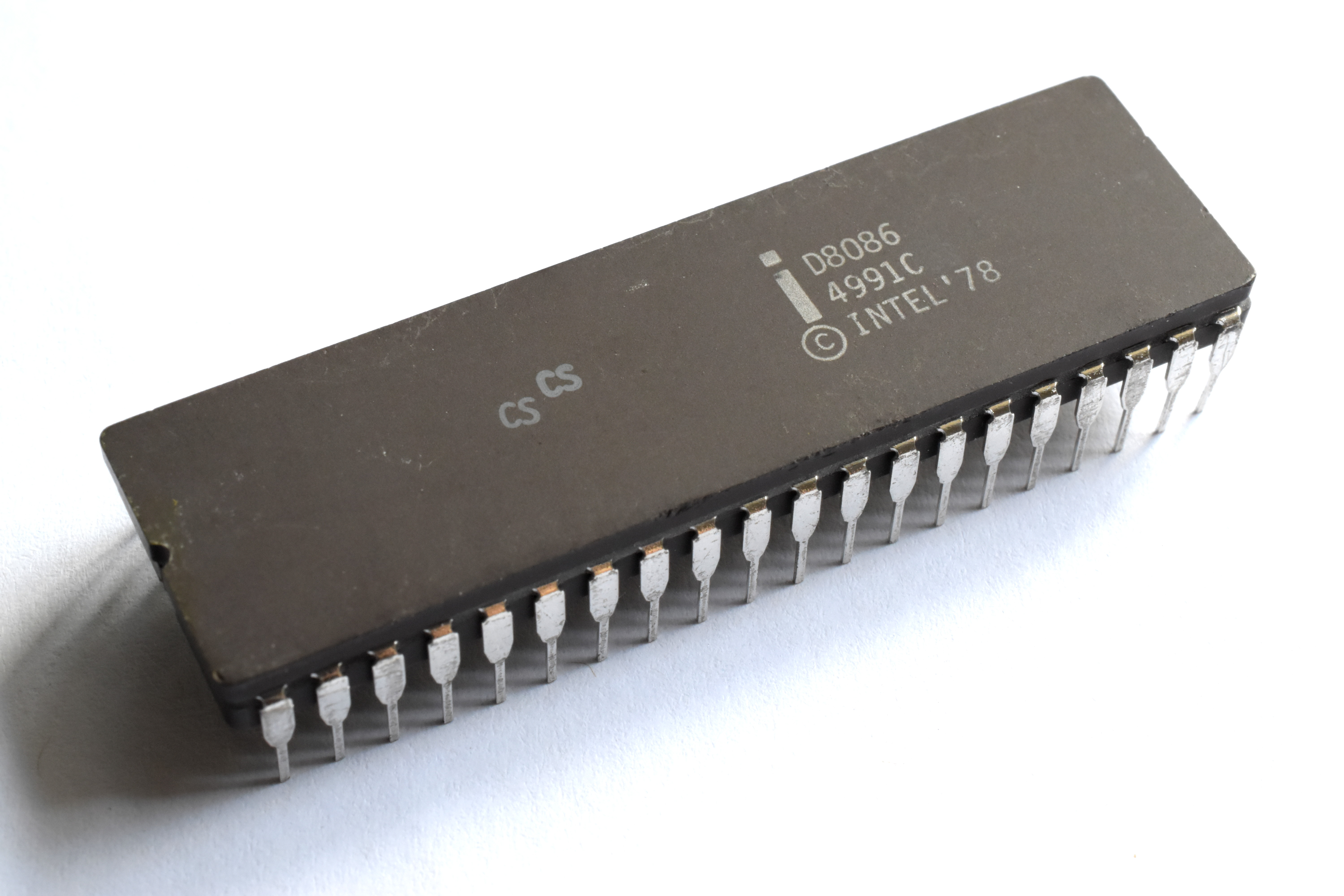
A ceramic D8086 variant

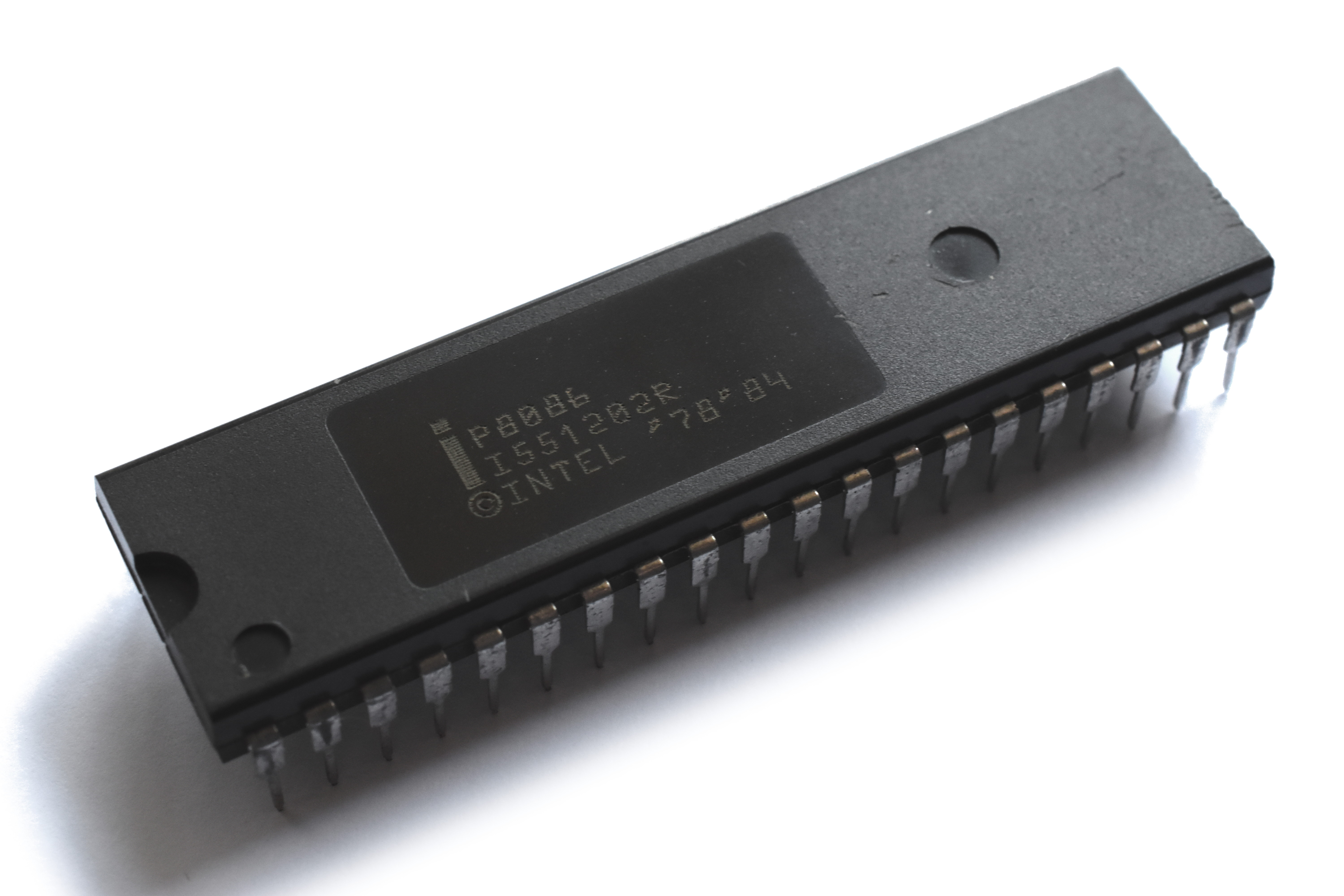
A plastic P8086 variant

=== List of Intel 8086 ===
Model number	Frequency	Technology	Temperature range	Package	Date of release	Price (USD) (Note: In quantity of 100.)
8086	5 MHz	HMOS	0 °C to 70 °C		June 8, 1978	$86.65
8086-1	10 MHz	HMOS II	Commercial			
8086-2	8 MHz	HMOS II	Commercial		January/February 1980	$200
8086-4	4 MHz	HMOS	Commercial			$72.50 (Note: Price reduced by 21% from USD $99.00, no information in quantity value listed.)
I8086	5 MHz	HMOS	Industrial −40 °C to +85 °C		May/June 1980	$173.25
M8086	5 MHz	HMOS	Military grade −55 °C to +125 °C			
80C86		CMOS		44 Pin PLCC (Note: Sampling Q4 1985)		

=== Derivatives and clones ===
Compatible—and, in many cases, enhanced—versions were manufactured by Fujitsu, Harris/Intersil, OKI, Siemens, Texas Instruments, NEC, Mitsubishi, and AMD. For example, the NEC V20 and NEC V30 pair were hardware-compatible with the 8088 and 8086 even though NEC made original Intel clones μPD8088D and μPD8086D respectively, but incorporated the instruction set of the 80186 along with some (but not all) of the 80186 speed enhancements, providing a drop-in capability to upgrade both instruction set and processing speed without manufacturers having to modify their designs. Such relatively simple and low-power 8086-compatible processors in CMOS are still used in embedded systems.

The electronics industry of the Soviet Union was able to clone the 8086 through both industrial espionage and reverse engineering. The resulting chip, K1810VM86, was binary and pin-compatible with the 8086.

i8086 and i8088 were respectively the cores of the Soviet-made PC-compatible EC1831 and EC1832 desktops. (EC1831 is the EC identification of IZOT 1036C and EC1832 is the EC identification of IZOT 1037C, developed and manufactured in Bulgaria. EC stands for Единая Система.) However, the EC1831 computer (IZOT 1036C) had significant hardware differences from the IBM PC prototype. The EC1831 was the first PC-compatible computer with dynamic bus sizing (US Pat. No 4,831,514). Later some of the EC1831 principles were adopted in PS/2 (US Pat. No 5,548,786) and some other machines (UK Patent Application, Publication No. GB-A-2211325, Published June 28, 1989).

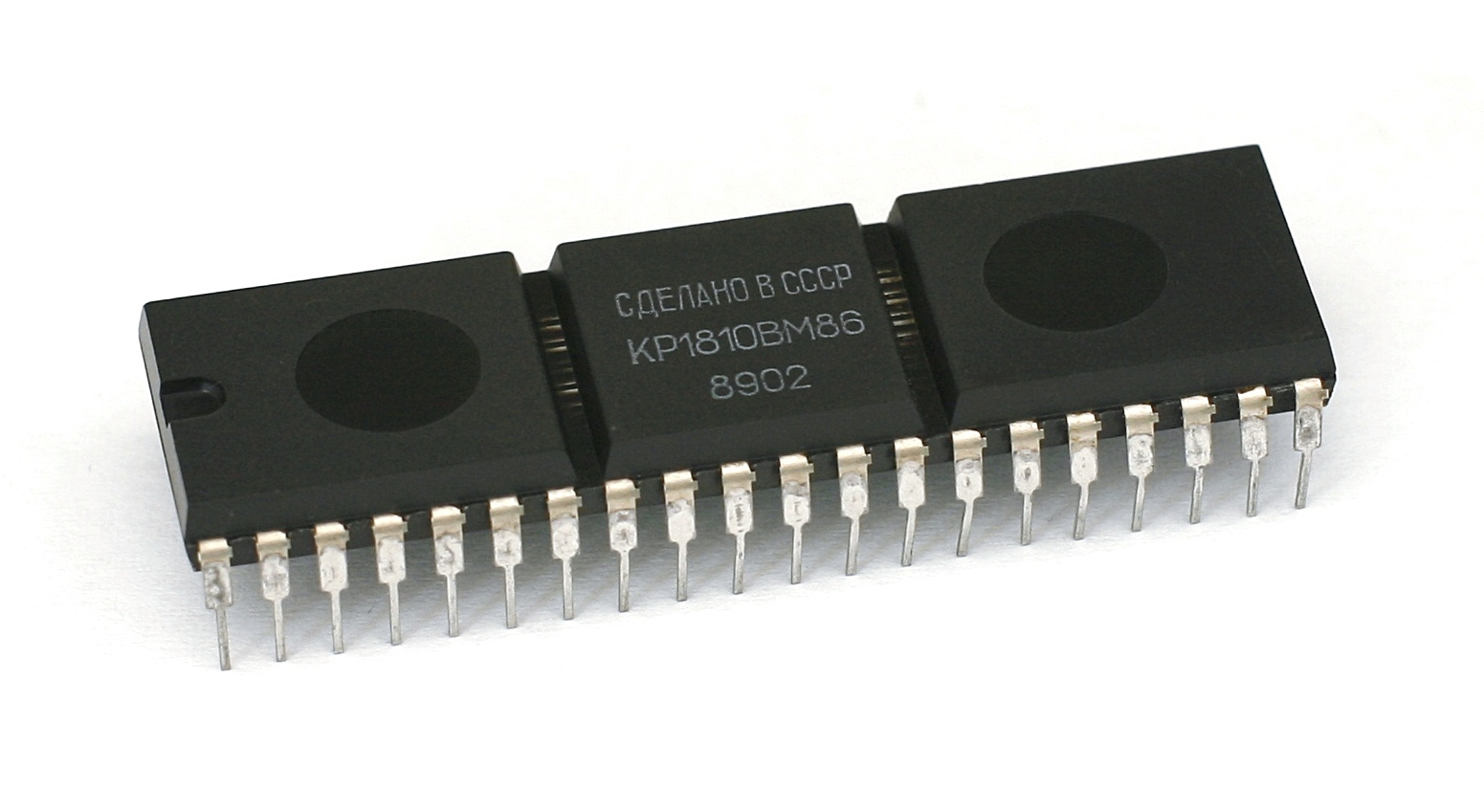
Soviet clone K1810VM86

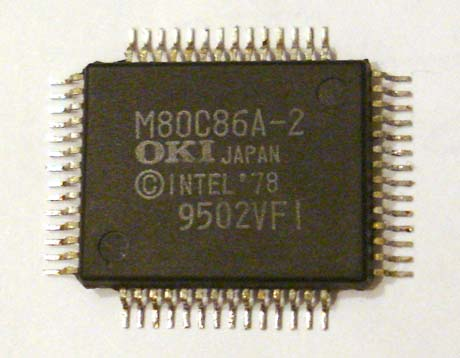
OKI M80C86A QFP-56

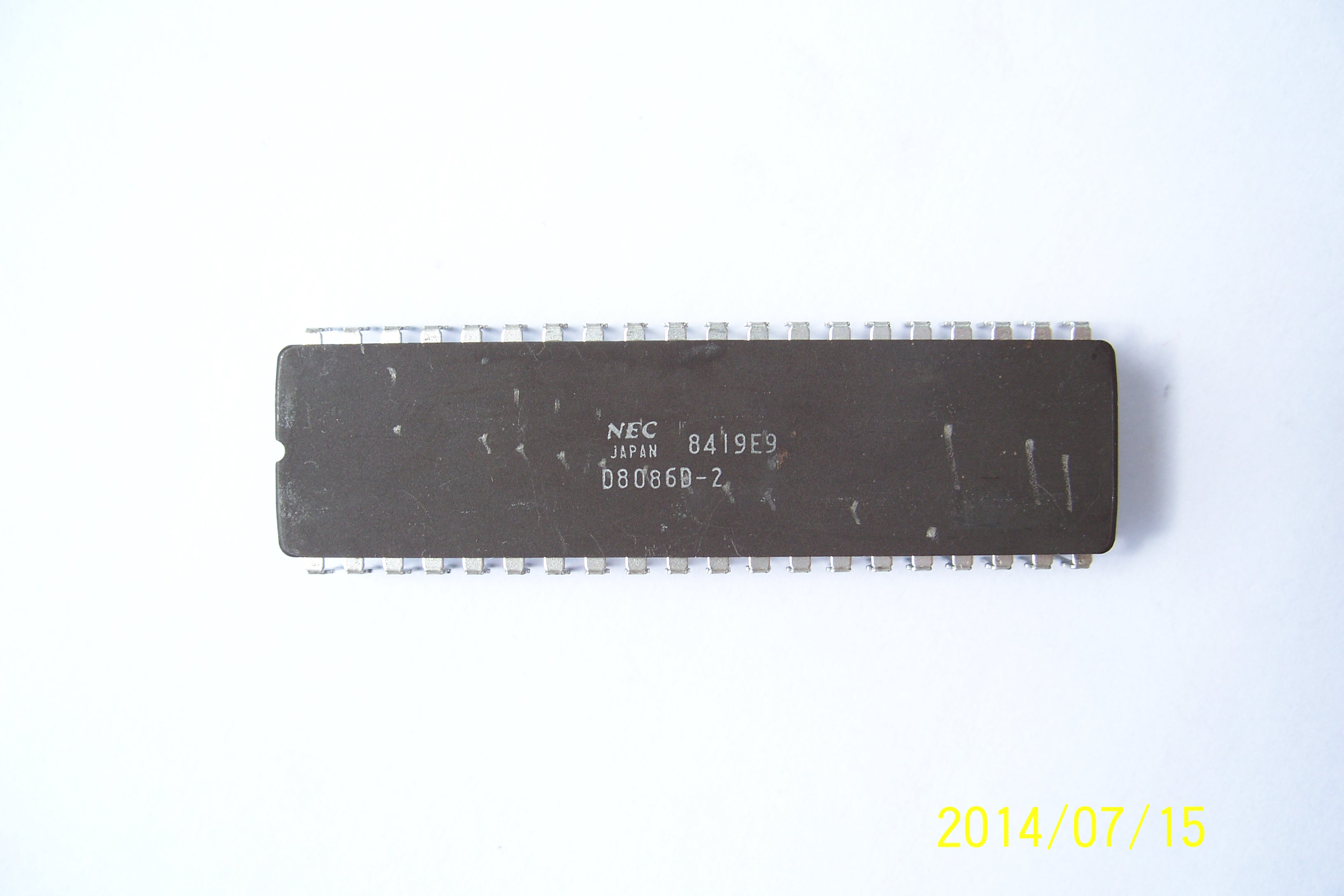
NEC μPD8086D-2 (8 MHz) from the year 1984, week 19 JAPAN (clone of Intel D8086-2)

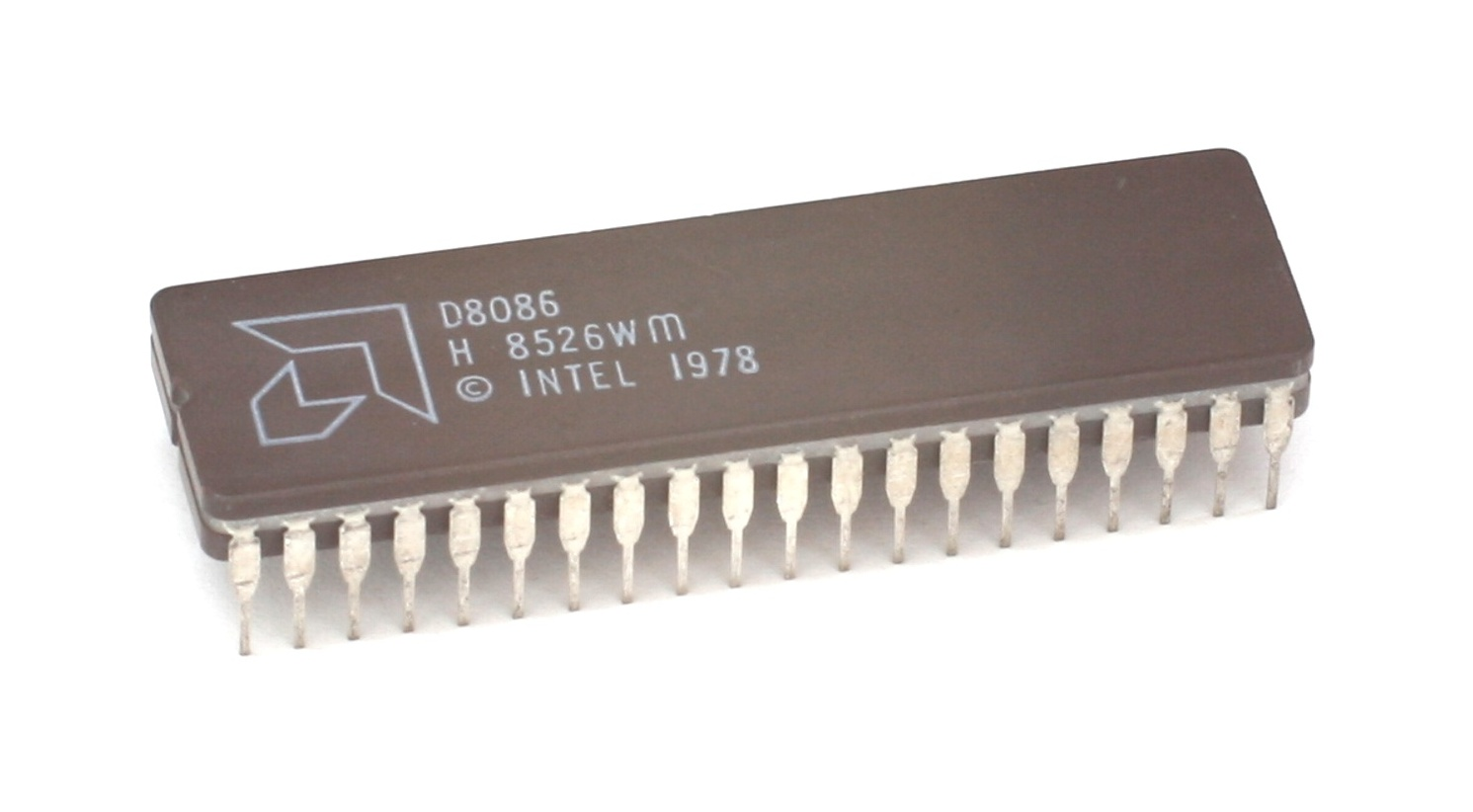
The AMD D8086

== Support chips ==
- Intel 8237: direct memory access (DMA) controller
- Intel 8251: universal synchronous/asynchronous receiver/transmitter at 19.2 kbit/s
- Intel 8253: programmable interval timer, 3x 16-bit max 10 MHz
- Intel 8255: programmable peripheral interface, 3x 8-bit I/O pins used for printer connection etc.
- Intel 8259: programmable interrupt controller
- Intel 8279: keyboard/display controller, scans a keyboard matrix and display matrix like 7-seg
- Intel 8282/8283: 8-bit latch
- Intel 8284: clock generator
- Intel 8286/8287: bidirectional 8-bit driver. In 1980 both Intel I8286/I8287 (industrial grade) version were available for US$16.25 in quantities of 100.
- Intel 8288: bus controller
- Intel 8289: bus arbiter
- NEC μPD765 or Intel 8272A: floppy controller

== Microcomputers using the 8086 ==
- The Intel Multibus-compatible single-board computer ISBC 86/12 was announced in 1978.
- The Xerox NoteTaker was one of the earliest portable computer designs in 1978 and used three 8086 chips (as CPU, graphics processor, and I/O processor), but never entered commercial production.
- Seattle Computer Products shipped S-100 bus based 8086 systems (SCP200B) as early as November 1979.
- The Norwegian Mycron 2000, introduced in 1980s
- The first Compaq Deskpro used an 8086 running at 7.16 MHz, but was compatible with add-in cards designed for the 4.77 MHz IBM PC XT and could switch the CPU down to the lower speed (which also switched in a memory bus buffer to simulate the 8088's slower access) to avoid software timing issues.
- An 8 MHz 8086-2 was used in the AT&T 6300 PC (built by Olivetti, and known globally under several brands and model numbers), an IBM PC-compatible desktop microcomputer. The M24 / PC 6300 has IBM PC/XT compatible 8-bit expansion slots, but some of them have a proprietary extension providing the full 16-bit data bus of the 8086 CPU (similar in concept to the 16-bit slots of the IBM PC AT, but different in the design details, and physically incompatible), and all system peripherals including the onboard video system also enjoy 16-bit data transfers. The later Olivetti M24SP featured an 8086-2 running at the full maximum 10 MHz.
- The IBM PS/2 models 25 and 30 were built with an 8 MHz 8086.
- The Amstrad PC1512, PC1640, PC2086, PC3086 and PC5086 all used 8086 CPUs at 8 MHz.
- The NEC PC-9801.
- The Tandy 1000 SL-series and RL machines used 9.47 MHz 8086 CPUs.
- The IBM Displaywriter word processing machine and the Wang Professional Computer, manufactured by Wang Laboratories, also used the 8086.
- NASA used original 8086 CPUs on equipment for ground-based maintenance of the Space Shuttle Discovery until the end of the space shuttle program in 2011. This decision was made to prevent software regression that might result from upgrading or from switching to imperfect clones.
- KAMAN Process and Area Radiation Monitors
- The Tektronix 4170 ran CP/M-86 and used an 8086 4170 Local Graphics Processing Unit Instruction Manual (PDF)

One of the most influential microcomputers of all, the IBM PC, used the Intel 8088, a version of the 8086 with an 8-bit data bus.

== See also ==
- Transistor count
- iAPX, for the iAPX name
