= Intel 8085 =

8-bit microprocessor

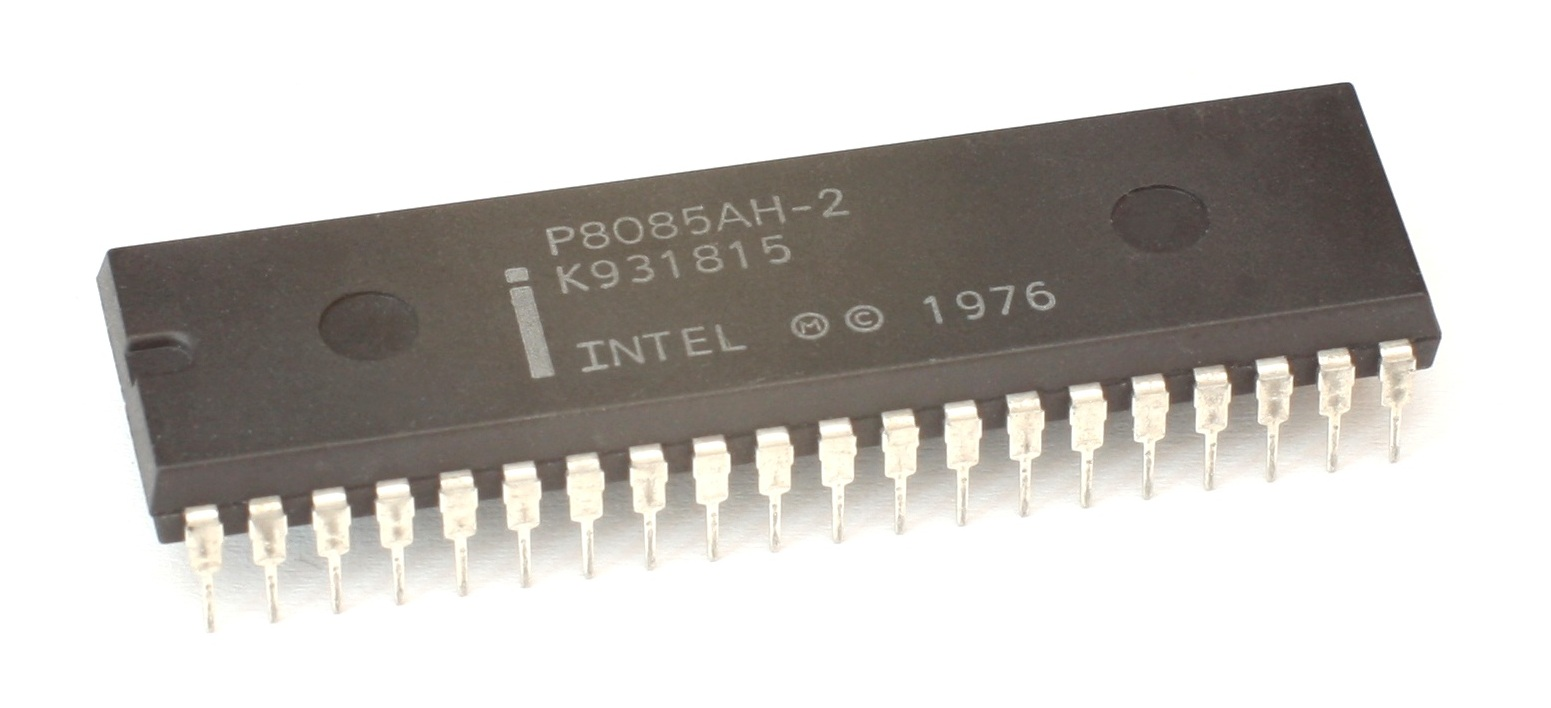
- An Intel P8085AH-2 processor variant with black plastic and silver pins

General information
- Launched: March 1976
- Discontinued: 2000
- Common manufacturer: Intel and several others

Performance
- Max. CPU clock rate: 3 MHz to 6 MHz
- Data width: 8 bits
- Address width: 16 bits

Physical specifications
- Transistors: 6,500
- Package: 40-pin DIP
- Socket: DIP40

Architecture and classification
- Technology node: 3 μm
- Instruction set: 8085

History
- Predecessor: Intel 8080
- Successor: Intel 8086

Support status
- Unsupported

The Intel 8085 ("eighty-eighty-five") is an 8-bit microprocessor produced by Intel and introduced in March 1976. It is binary compatible with the more famous Intel 8080. It is the last 8-bit microprocessor developed by Intel. The "5" in the part number highlighted the fact that the 8085 uses a single +5-volt (V) power supply, compared to the 8080's +5, −5, and +12 V, which makes the 8085 easier to integrate into systems that by this time were mostly +5 V.

The other major change was the addition of four new interrupt pins and a serial port, with separate input and output pins. This was often all that was needed in simple systems and eliminated the need for separate integrated circuits to provide this functionality, as well as simplifying the computer bus as a result. The only changes in the instruction set compared to the 8080 were instructions for reading and writing data using these pins.

The 8085 is supplied in a 40-pin DIP package. Given the new pins, this required multiplexing 8-bits of the address (AD_{0}–AD_{7}) bus with the data bus. This means that specifying a complete 16-bit address requires it to be sent via two 8-bit pathways, and one of those two has to be temporarily latched using separate hardware such as a 74LS373. Intel manufactured several support chips with an address latch built in. These include the 8755, with an address latch, 2 KB of EPROM and 16 I/O pins, and the 8155 with 256 bytes of RAM, 22 I/O pins and a 14-bit programmable timer/counter. The multiplexed address/data bus reduced the number of PCB tracks between the 8085 and such memory and I/O chips.

While the 8085 was an improvement on the 8080, it was eclipsed by the Zilog Z80 in the late 1970s and early 1980s, which took over much of the desktop computer market.

Although not widely used in computers, the 8085 had a long life as a microcontroller. Once designed into such products as the DECtape II controller and the VT102 video terminal in the late 1970s, the 8085 served for new production throughout the lifetime of those products.

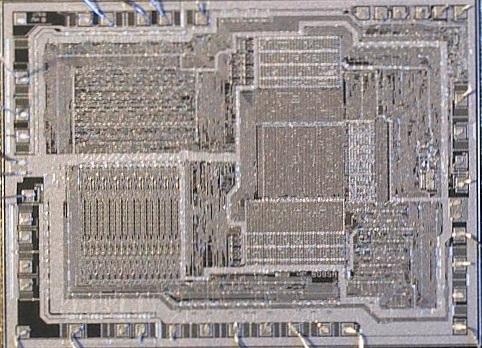
Intel 8085A CPU die

== Description ==
i8085 microarchitecture

i8085 pinout

The 8085 is a conventional von Neumann design based on the Intel 8080. Unlike the 8080 it does not multiplex state signals onto the data bus, but the 8-bit data bus is instead multiplexed with the lower eight bits of the 16-bit address bus to limit the number of pins to 40. State signals are provided by dedicated bus control signal pins and two dedicated bus state ID pins named S0 and S1. Pin 40 is used for the power supply (+5 V) and pin 20 for ground. Pin 39 is used as the Hold pin.

The Intel 8085 processor was designed using nMOS circuitry, with later "H" versions implemented in Intel's enhanced nMOS process known as HMOS II ("High-performance MOS"), which was originally developed for fast static RAM products. Unlike the 8080, the 8085 requires only a single 5-volt power supply, similar to its competing processors. The 8085 contains approximately 6,500 transistors.

The 8085 incorporates the functions of the 8224 (clock generator) and the 8228 (system controller) on chip, increasing the level of integration. A downside compared to similar contemporary designs (such as the Z80) is the fact that the buses require demultiplexing; however, address latches in the Intel 8155, 8355, and 8755 memory chips allow a direct interface, so an 8085 along with these chips is almost a complete system.

The 8085 has extensions to support new interrupts, with three maskable vectored interrupts (RST 7.5, RST 6.5 and RST 5.5), one non-maskable interrupt (TRAP), and one externally serviced interrupt (INTR). Each of these five interrupts has a separate pin on the processor, a feature which permits simple systems to avoid the cost of a separate interrupt controller. The RST 7.5 interrupt is edge triggered (latched), while RST 5.5 and 6.5 are level-sensitive. All interrupts except TRAP are enabled by the EI instruction and disabled by the DI instruction. In addition, the SIM (Set Interrupt Mask) and RIM (Read Interrupt Mask) instructions, the only instructions of the 8085 that are not from the 8080 design, allow each of the three maskable RST interrupts to be individually masked. All three are masked after a normal CPU reset. SIM and RIM also allow the global interrupt mask state and the three independent RST interrupt mask states to be read, the pending-interrupt states of those same three interrupts to be read, the RST 7.5 trigger-latch flip-flop to be reset (cancelling the pending interrupt without servicing it), and serial data to be sent and received via the SOD and SID pins, respectively, all under program control and independently of each other.

SIM and RIM each execute in four clock cycles (T states), making it possible to sample SID and/or toggle SOD considerably faster than it is possible to toggle or sample a signal via any I/O or memory-mapped port, e.g. one of the ports of an 8155. (In this way, SID can be compared to the SO ["Set Overflow"] pin of the 6502 CPU contemporary to the 8085.)

Like the 8080, the 8085 can accommodate slower memories through externally generated wait states (pin 35, READY), and has provisions for Direct Memory Access (DMA) using HOLD and HLDA signals (pins 39 and 38). An improvement over the 8080 is that the 8085 can itself drive a piezoelectric crystal directly connected to it, and a built-in clock generator generates the internal high-amplitude two-phase clock signals at half the crystal frequency (a 6.14 MHz crystal would yield a 3.07 MHz clock, for instance). The internal clock is available on an output pin, to drive peripheral devices or other CPUs in lock-step synchrony with the CPU from which the signal is output. The 8085 can also be clocked by an external oscillator (making it feasible to use the 8085 in synchronous multi-processor systems using a system-wide common clock for all CPUs, or to synchronize the CPU to an external time reference such as that from a video source or a high-precision time reference).

The 8085 is a binary compatible follow-up on the 8080. It supports the complete instruction set of the 8080, with exactly the same instruction behavior, including all effects on the CPU flags (except for the AND/ANI operation, which sets the AC flag differently). This means that the vast majority of object code (any program image in ROM or RAM) that runs successfully on the 8080 can run directly on the 8085 without translation or modification. (Exceptions include timing-critical code and code that is sensitive to the aforementioned difference in the AC flag setting or differences in undocumented CPU behavior.) 8085 instruction timings differ slightly from the 8080—some 8-bit operations, including INR, DCR, and the heavily used MOV r,r instructions, are one clock cycle faster, but instructions that involve 16-bit operations, including stack PUSH (which decrements the 16-bit SP register) generally one cycle slower. Conditional jumps not taken are three clocks faster on the 8085. As mentioned already, only the SIM and RIM instructions were new to the 8085. (Note: Note that the Z80 assigns different instructions—two of the Z80's 6 relative jumps—to the opcodes that the 8085 uses for RIM and SIM, making 8085 programs that use these instructions generally unable to run on the Z80 without modification. Since use of these instructions usually relates to 8085-specific hardware features, the necessary program modification would typically be nontrivial.)

=== Programming model ===
Intel 8085 registers
^{1}_{5}	^{1}_{4}	^{1}_{3}	^{1}_{2}	^{1}_{1}	^{1}_{0}	^{0}_{9}	^{0}_{8}	^{0}_{7}	^{0}_{6}	^{0}_{5}	^{0}_{4}	^{0}_{3}	^{0}_{2}	^{0}_{1}	^{0}_{0}	(bit position)
Main registers
A								Flags								Program Status Word
B								C								B
D								E								D
H								L								H (indirect address)
Index registers
SP																Stack Pointer
Program counter
PC																Program Counter
Status register
								S	Z	-	AC	-	P	-	CY	Flags
Interrupt Mask Register
								SO	SE	-	R7.5	MSE	E7.5 E6.5 E5.5			SIM (write)
								SI	I7.5 I6.5 I5.5			IE	E7.5 E6.5 E5.5			RIM (read)

The processor has seven 8-bit registers accessible to the programmer, named A, B, C, D, E, H, and L, where A is also known as the accumulator. The other six registers can be used as independent byte-registers or as three 16-bit register pairs, BC, DE, and HL (or B, D, H, as referred to in Intel documents), depending on the particular instruction.

Some instructions use HL as a (limited) 16-bit accumulator. As in the 8080, the contents of the memory address pointed to by HL can be accessed as pseudo register M. It also has a 16-bit program counter and a 16-bit stack pointer to memory (replacing the 8008's internal stack). The accumulator stores the results of arithmetic and logical operations, and the flags register bits (sign, zero, auxiliary carry, parity, and carry flags) are set or cleared according to the results of these operations. The sign flag is set if the result has a negative sign (i.e. it is set if bit 7 of the accumulator is set). The auxiliary or half carry flag is set if a carryover from bit 3 to bit 4 occurred. The parity flag is set to 1 if the parity (number of 1-bits) of the accumulator is even; if odd, it is cleared. The zero flag is set if the result of the operation was 0. Lastly, the carry flag is set if a carryover from bit 7 of the accumulator (the MSB) occurred. PUSH PSW and POP PSW can save and restore the accumulator and flags.

=== Commands/instructions ===
As in many other 8-bit processors, all instructions are encoded in a single byte (including register-numbers, but excluding immediate data), for simplicity. Some of them are followed by one or two bytes of data, which can be an immediate operand, a memory address, or a port number. A NOP "no operation" instruction exists, which does not modify any of the registers or flags. Like larger processors, it has CALL and RET instructions for multi-level procedure calls and returns (which can be conditionally executed, like jumps) and instructions to save and restore any 16-bit register-pair on the machine stack. There are also eight one-byte call instructions (RST) for subroutines located at the fixed addresses 00h, 08h, 10h,...,38h. These are intended to be supplied by external hardware in order to invoke a corresponding interrupt-service routine, but are also often employed as fast system calls. One sophisticated instruction is XTHL, which is used for exchanging the register pair HL with the value stored at the address indicated by the stack pointer.

==== 8-bit instructions ====
All two-operand 8-bit arithmetic and logical (ALU) operations work on the 8-bit accumulator (the A register). For two-operand 8-bit operations, the other operand can be either an immediate value, another 8-bit register, or a memory cell addressed by the 16-bit register pair HL. The only 8-bit ALU operations that can have a destination other than the accumulator are the unary incrementation or decrementation instructions, which can operate on any 8-bit register or on memory addressed by HL. Direct copying is supported between any two 8-bit registers and between any 8-bit register and an HL-addressed memory cell, using the MOV instruction. An immediate value can also be moved into any of the foregoing destinations, using the MVI instruction. Due to the regular encoding of the MOV instruction (using nearly a quarter of the entire opcode space) there are redundant codes to copy a register into itself (MOV B,B, for instance), which are of little use, except for delays. (Note: Even so, there is no need for seven different effectively identical delay instructions, and they are also identical in effect and form to the NOP instruction, except that NOP conveniently has the opcode 00 hex.) However, what would have been a copy from the HL-addressed cell into itself (i.e., MOV M,M) instead encodes the HLT instruction, halting execution until an external reset or unmasked interrupt occurs. (Note: The TRAP interrupt, being an NMI, can always bring the 8085 out of the HALT state.)

==== 16-bit operations ====
Although the 8085 is an 8-bit processor, it has some 16-bit operations. Any of the three 16-bit register pairs (BC, DE, HL) or SP can be loaded with an immediate 16-bit value (using LXI), incremented or decremented (using INX and DCX), or added to HL (using DAD). LHLD loads HL from directly addressed memory and SHLD stores HL likewise. The XCHG operation exchanges the values of HL and DE. XTHL exchanges last item pushed on stack with HL. Adding HL to itself performs a 16-bit arithmetic left shift with one instruction. The only 16-bit instruction that affects any flag is DAD (adding BC, DE, HL, or SP to HL), which updates the carry flag to facilitate 24-bit or larger additions and left shifts. Adding the stack pointer to HL is useful for indexing variables in (recursive) stack frames. A stack frame can be allocated using DAD SP and SPHL, and a branch to a computed pointer can be done with PCHL. These abilities make it feasible to compile languages such as PL/M, Pascal, or C with 16-bit variables and produce 8085 machine code. Subtraction and bitwise logical operations on 16 bits is done in 8-bit steps. Operations that have to be implemented by program code (subroutine libraries) include comparisons of signed integers as well as multiplication and division.

==== Instruction set ====
Differences between the 8080 and the 8085 are highlighted. Compared to the 8080, the 8085 may take more clocks↑, fewer clocks↓, or a mixture↕. For explanations of some symbols, see lower part of the table.

Opcode								Operands		Mnemonic	Clocks	Description
7	6	5	4	3	2	1	0	b2	b3	Mnemonic	Clocks	Description
0	0	0	0	0	0	0	0	—	—	NOP	4	No operation
0	0	RP		0	0	0	1	datlo	dathi	LXI rp,data	10	RP ← data
0	0	RP		0	0	1	0	—	—	STAX rp	7	(RP) ← A [BC or DE only]
0	0	RP		0	0	1	1	—	—	INX rp	6 ↑	RP ← RP + 1
0	0	DDD			1	0	0	—	—	INR ddd	4/10 ↓	DDD ← DDD + 1
0	0	DDD			1	0	1	—	—	DCR ddd	4/10 ↓	DDD ← DDD - 1
0	0	DDD			1	1	0	data	—	MVI ddd,data	7/10	DDD ← data
0	0	RP		1	0	0	1	—	—	DAD rp	10	HL ← HL + RP
0	0	RP		1	0	1	0	—	—	LDAX rp	7	A ← (RP) [BC or DE only]
0	0	RP		1	0	1	1	—	—	DCX rp	6 ↑	RP ← RP - 1
0	0	0	0	0	1	1	1	—	—	RLC	4	A_{1-7} ← A_{0-6}; A_{0} ← Cy ← A_{7}
0	0	0	0	1	1	1	1	—	—	RRC	4	A_{0-6} ← A_{1-7}; A_{7} ← Cy ← A_{0}
0	0	0	1	0	1	1	1	—	—	RAL	4	A_{1-7} ← A_{0-6}; Cy ← A_{7}; A_{0} ← Cy
0	0	0	1	1	1	1	1	—	—	RAR	4	A_{0-6} ← A_{1-7}; Cy ← A_{0}; A_{7} ← Cy
0	0	1	0	0	0	0	0	—	—	RIM	4	A ← interrupt mask
0	0	1	0	0	0	1	0	addlo	addhi	SHLD add	16	(add) ← HL
0	0	1	0	0	1	1	1	—	—	DAA	4	If A_{0-3} > 9 OR AC = 1 then A ← A + 6; then if A_{4-7} > 9 OR Cy = 1 then A ← A + 0x60
0	0	1	0	1	0	1	0	addlo	addhi	LHLD add	16	HL ← (add)
0	0	1	0	1	1	1	1	—	—	CMA	4	A ← ¬A
0	0	1	1	0	0	0	0	—	—	SIM	4	interrupt mask ← A
0	0	1	1	0	0	1	0	addlo	addhi	STA add	13	(add) ← A
0	0	1	1	0	1	1	1	—	—	STC	4	Cy ← 1
0	0	1	1	1	0	1	0	addlo	addhi	LDA add	13	A ← (add)
0	0	1	1	1	1	1	1	—	—	CMC	4	Cy ← ¬Cy
0	1	DDD			SSS			—	—	MOV ddd,sss	4/7 ↓	DDD ← SSS
0	1	1	1	0	1	1	0	—	—	HLT	5 ↓	Halt
1	0	ALU			SSS			—	—	ADD ADC SUB SBB ANA XRA ORA CMP sss	4/7	A ← A [ALU operation] SSS
1	1	CC			0	0	0	—	—	Rcc (RET conditional)	6/12 ↑	If cc true, PC ← (SP), SP ← SP + 2
1	1	RP		0	0	0	1	—	—	POP rp	10	RP ← (SP), SP ← SP + 2
1	1	CC			0	1	0	addlo	addhi	Jcc add (JMP conditional)	7/10 ↓	If cc true, PC ← add
1	1	0	0	0	0	1	1	addlo	addhi	JMP add	10	PC ← add
1	1	CC			1	0	0	addlo	addhi	Ccc add (CALL conditional)	9/18 ↕	If cc true, SP ← SP - 2, (SP) ← PC, PC ← add
1	1	RP		0	1	0	1	—	—	PUSH rp	12 ↑	SP ← SP - 2, (SP) ← RP
1	1	ALU			1	1	0	data	—	ADI ACI SUI SBI ANI XRI ORI CPI data	7	A ← A [ALU operation] data
1	1	N			1	1	1	—	—	RST n	12 ↑	SP ← SP - 2, (SP) ← PC, PC ← N x 8
1	1	0	0	1	0	0	1	—	—	RET	10	PC ← (SP), SP ← SP + 2
1	1	0	0	1	1	0	1	addlo	addhi	CALL add	18 ↑	SP ← SP - 2, (SP) ← PC, PC ← add
1	1	0	1	0	0	1	1	port	—	OUT port	10	Port ← A
1	1	0	1	1	0	1	1	port	—	IN port	10	A ← Port
1	1	1	0	0	0	1	1	—	—	XTHL	16 ↓	HL ↔ (SP)
1	1	1	0	1	0	0	1	—	—	PCHL	6 ↑	PC ← HL
1	1	1	0	1	0	1	1	—	—	XCHG	4	HL ↔ DE
1	1	1	1	0	0	1	1	—	—	DI	4	Disable interrupts
1	1	1	1	1	0	0	1	—	—	SPHL	6 ↑	SP ← HL
1	1	1	1	1	0	1	1	—	—	EI	4	Enable interrupts
7	6	5	4	3	2	1	0	b2	b3	Mnemonic	Clocks	Description
SSS DDD					2	1	0	CC		ALU	RP	
B					0	0	0	NZ		ADD ADI (A ← A + arg)	BC	
C					0	0	1	Z		ADC ACI (A ← A + arg + Cy)	DE	
D					0	1	0	NC		SUB SUI (A ← A - arg)	HL	
E					0	1	1	C		SBB SBI (A ← A - arg - Cy)	SP or PSW	
H					1	0	0	PO		ANA ANI (A ← A ∧ arg)		
L					1	0	1	PE		XRA XRI (A ← A ⊻ arg)		
M					1	1	0	P		ORA ORI (A ← A ∨ arg)		
A					1	1	1	N		CMP CPI (A - arg)		
SSS DDD					2	1	0	CC		ALU		

==== Undocumented instructions ====
A number of undocumented instructions and flags were discovered by two software engineers, Wolfgang Dehnhardt and Villy M. Sorensen in the process of developing an 8085 assembler. These instructions use 16-bit operands and include indirect loading and storing of a word, a subtraction, a shift, a rotate, and offset operations. Two new flags were also implemented. At least one second source manufacturer documented the new instructions.

By the time 8085 was designed but not yet announced, many designers found it to be inferior to the competing products already on the market. The next generation 16-bit 8086 CPU was already in development. Intel made a last-minute decision to leave 10 out of 12 new 8085 instructions undocumented to speed up and simplify the design of the upcoming 8086 CPU.

8085 undocumented status
Status register
^{0}_{7}	^{0}_{6}	^{0}_{5}	^{0}_{4}	^{0}_{3}	^{0}_{2}	^{0}_{1}	^{0}_{0}	(bit position)
S	Z	UI	AC	-	P	V	CY	Flags

Opcode								Operands		Mnemonic	Clocks	Description
7	6	5	4	3	2	1	0	b2	b3	Mnemonic	Clocks	Description
0	0	0	0	1	0	0	0	—	—	DSUB	10	HL ← HL - BC
0	0	0	1	0	0	0	0	—	—	ARHL	7	Cy ← HL_{0}; HL_{0-14} ← HL_{1-15}
0	0	0	1	1	0	0	0	—	—	RDEL	10	DE_{1-15} ← DE_{0-14}; DE_{0} ← Cy; Cy ← DE_{15}
0	0	1	0	1	0	0	0	data	—	LDHI	10	DE ← HL + data
0	0	1	1	1	0	0	0	data	—	LDSI	10	DE ← SP + data
1	1	0	0	1	0	0	0	—	—	RSTV	6/12	If V=1 then SP ← SP - 2, (SP) ← PC, PC ← 0x40
1	1	0	1	1	0	0	1	—	—	SHLX	10	(DE) ← HL
1	1	0	1	1	1	0	1	addlo	addhi	JNUI add	7/10	If UI = 0, PC ← add
1	1	1	0	1	1	0	1	—	—	LHLX	10	HL ← (DE)
1	1	1	1	1	1	0	1	addlo	addhi	JUI add	7/10	If UI = 1, PC ← add

=== Input/output scheme ===
The 8085 supports both port-mapped and memory-mapped I/O. It supports up to 256 input/output (I/O) ports via dedicated Input/Output instructions, with port addresses as operands. Port-mapped IO can be an advantage on processors with limited address space. During a port-mapped I/O bus cycle, the 8-bit I/O address is output by the CPU on both the lower and upper halves of the 16-bit address bus.

Devices designed for memory mapped I/O can also be accessed by using the LDA (load accumulator from a 16-bit address) and STA (store accumulator at a 16-bit address specified) instructions, or any other instructions that have memory operands. A memory-mapped IO transfer cycle appears on the bus as a normal memory access cycle.

=== Development system ===
Intel produced a series of development systems for the 8080 and 8085, known as the MDS-80 Microprocessor System. The original development system had an 8080 processor. Later 8085 and 8086 support was added including ICE (in-circuit emulators). It is a large and heavy desktop box, about a 20" cube (in the Intel corporate blue color) which includes a CPU, monitor, and a single 8-inch floppy disk drive. Later an external box was made available with two more floppy drives. It runs the ISIS operating system and can also operate an emulator pod and an external EPROM programmer. This unit uses the Multibus card cage which was intended just for the development system. A surprising number of spare card cages and processors were being sold, leading to the development of the Multibus as a separate product.

The later iPDS is a portable unit, about 8" × 16" × 20", with a handle. It has a small green screen, a keyboard built into the top, a 5¼ inch floppy disk drive, and runs the ISIS-II operating system. It can also accept a second 8085 processor, allowing a limited form of multi-processor operation where both processors run simultaneously and independently. The screen and keyboard can be switched between them, allowing programs to be assembled on one processor (large programs took a while) while files are edited in the other. It has a bubble memory option and various programming modules, including EPROM, and Intel 8048 and 8051 programming modules which are plugged into the side, replacing stand-alone device programmers. In addition to an 8080/8085 assembler, Intel produced a number of compilers including those for PL/M-80 and Pascal, and a set of tools for linking and statically locating programs to enable them to be burned into EPROMs and used in embedded systems.

A lower cost "MCS-85 System Design Kit" (SDK-85) board contains an 8085 CPU, an 8355 ROM containing a debugging monitor program, an 8155 RAM and 22 I/O ports, an 8279 hex keypad and 8-digit 7-segment LED, and a TTY (Teletype) 20 mA current loop serial interface. Pads are available for one more 2K×8 8755 EPROM, and another 256 byte RAM 8155 I/O Timer/Counter can be optionally added. All data, control, and address signals are available on dual pin headers, and a large prototyping area is provided.

=== Speed and technology ===
Model Number	Process		Clock Speed	Tempe- rature Range	Current Rating	Power Tolerance	Package	Date of Release	Price (USD) (Note: In quantities of 100 and up)
Model Number	Node	Tech- nology	Clock Speed	Tempe- rature Range	Current Rating	Power Tolerance	Package	Date of Release	Price (USD)
8085A	NMOS	3 μm	3 MHz		170 mA	± 5%			6.25
P8085AH	HMOS II	2 μm	3 MHz		135 mA	± 10%	Plastic	Jul/Aug 1981	4.40
8085-2			5 MHz						
8085A-2	NMOS	3 μm	5 MHz		170 mA	± 5%			8.75
P8085AH-2	HMOS II	2 μm	5 MHz		135 mA	± 10%	Plastic	Jul/Aug 1981	5.80
P8085AH-1	HMOS II	2 μm	6 MHz				Plastic	Jul/Aug 1981	12.45
ID8085			3 MHz	Industrial				Mar/Apr 1979	38.75
M8085A			3 MHz	Military				Mar/Apr 1979	110.00

== Applications ==
The 8085 processor was used in a few early personal computers, for example, the TRS-80 Model 100 line used an OKI manufactured 80C85 (MSM80C85ARS). The CMOS version 80C85 of the NMOS/HMOS 8085 processor has several manufacturers. IBM used the 8085 in the IBM System/23 Datamaster concealed under the reference 4178615. In the Soviet Union, an 80C85 clone was developed under the designation IM1821VM85A (Russian: ИМ1821ВМ85А) which in 2016 was still in production. Some manufacturers provide variants with additional functions such as additional instructions.

The radiation hardened version of the 8085 has been in on-board instrument data processors for several NASA and ESA space physics missions in the 1990s and early 2000s, including CRRES, Polar, FAST, Cluster, HESSI, the Sojourner Mars Rover, and THEMIS. The Swiss company SAIA used the 8085 and the 8085–2 as the CPUs of their PCA1 line of programmable logic controllers during the 1980s.

Pro-Log Corp. put the 8085 and supporting hardware on an STD Bus format card containing CPU, RAM, sockets for ROM/EPROM, I/O and external bus interfaces. The included Instruction Set Reference Card uses entirely different mnemonics for the Intel 8085 CPU. The product was a direct competitor to Intel's Multibus card offerings.

Western Digital's WD1003-SCS is a 1:1 interleave SCSI disk controller that interfaces to ST506-style disk drives. It is an example of an embedded 8085 application that was just beyond the capabilities of available microcontrollers as its RAM required DMA access.

Intel 8085 second sources

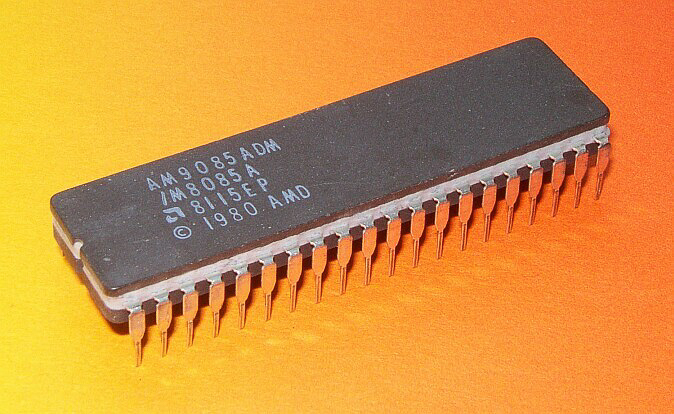
AMD Am9085

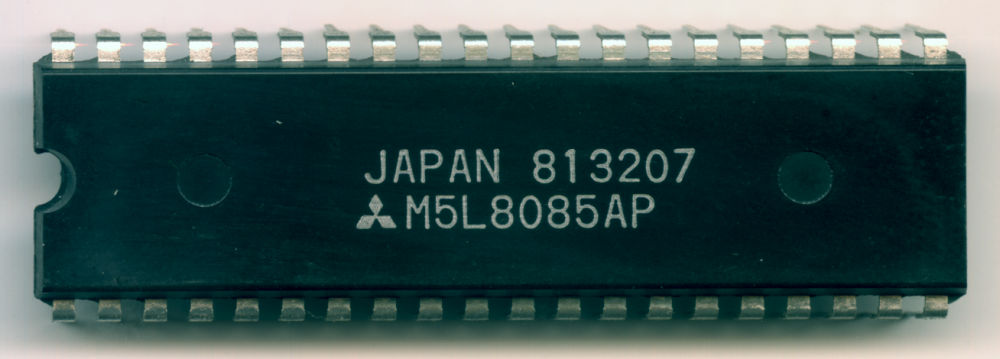
Mitsubishi M5L8085

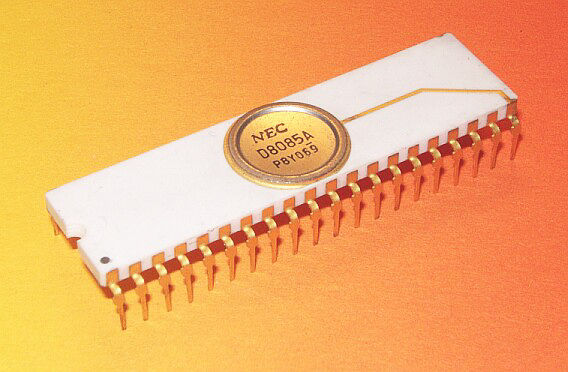
NEC μPD8085

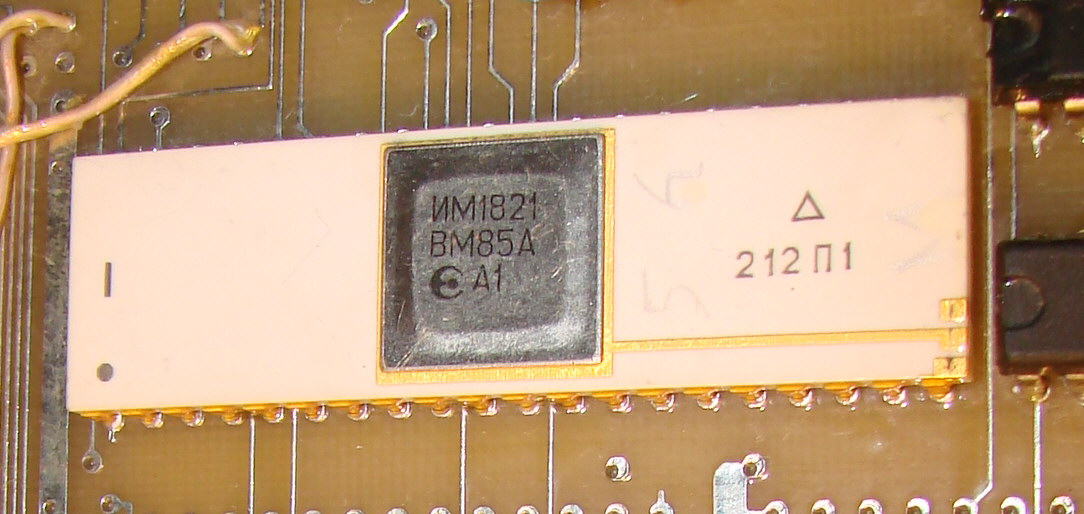
NZPP Novosibirsk IM1821VM85 (Soviet Union)

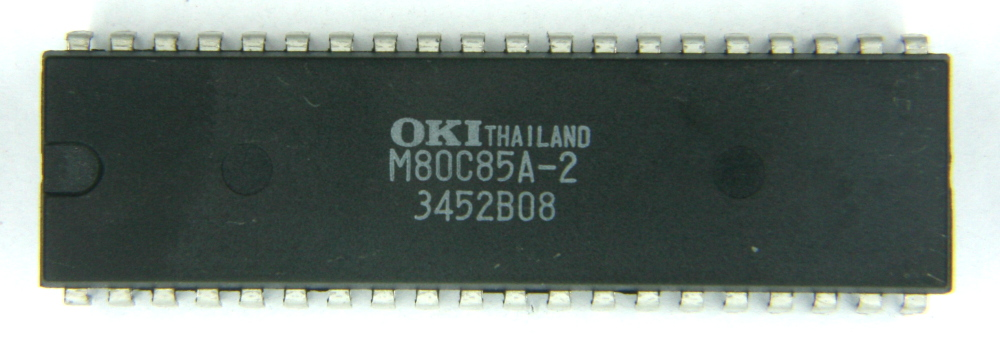
OKI M80C85

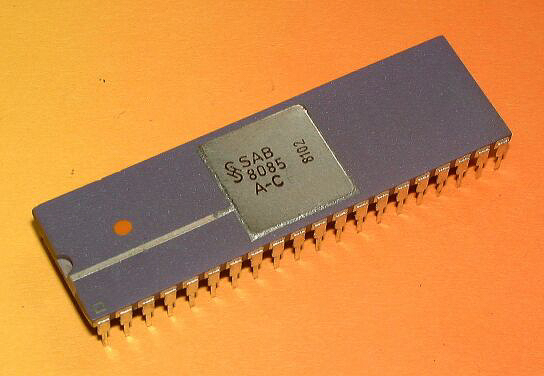
Siemens SAB8085

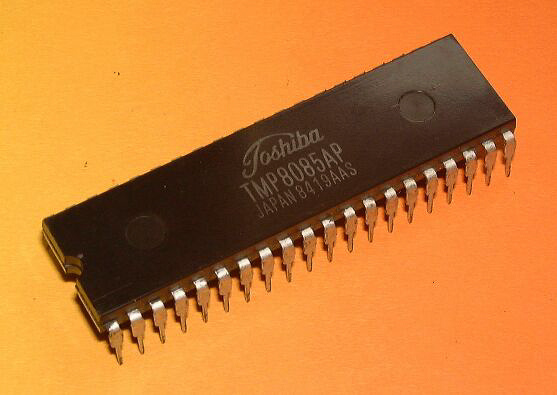
Toshiba TMP8085

== MCS-85 family ==
The 8085 CPU is one part of a family of chips developed by Intel for building a complete system. Many of these support chips were also used with other processors. The original IBM PC based on the Intel 8088 processor used several of these chips; the equivalent functions today are provided by VLSI chips, namely the "Southbridge" chips.

- 8085 – CPU
- 8231 – Arithmetic Processing Unit
- 8232 – Floating-Point Processor

=== Static RAM ===
- 8155 – 2K-bit static MOS RAM with 3 I/O Ports and Timer. Multiplexed address/data. Active low CE. The industrial version of ID8155 was available for US$37.50 in quantities of 100 and up. The military version of M8155 was available for US$100.00 in quantities of 100. There is a 5 MHz version of Intel 8155–2. The available 8155H was introduced using the HMOS II technology which it uses 30 percent less power than the previous generation. The plastic package version of P8155H (3 MHz) and P8155H-2 (5 MHz) are available for US$5.15 and US$6.40 per 100 in quantities respectively.
- 8156 – 2K-bit static MOS RAM with 3 I/O Ports and Timer. Multiplexed address/data. Active high CE. The industrial version of ID8156 was available for US$37.50 in quantities of 100. There is a 5 MHz version of Intel 8156–2. The available 8156H was introduced using the HMOS II technology which it uses 30 percent less power than the previous generation. The plastic package version of P8156H (3 MHz) and P8156H-2 (5 MHz) are available for US$5.15 and US$6.40 per 100 in quantities respectively.
- 8185 – 1,024 x 8-bit static RAM packaged in a compact 18-pin DIP. It includes three chip selects and an internal address latch driven directly by the 8085's ALE. The 5 MHz version of Intel 8185-2 was available for US$48.75 in quantity of 100.

=== ROM memory ===
- 8355 – 2,048 × 8-bit ROM, two 8-bit I/O ports. Multiplexed address/data. The industrial version of ID8355 was available for US$22.00 in quantities of 1000. There is a 5 MHz version of Intel 8355–2.
- 8755 – 2048 x 8-bit EPROM, two 8-bit I/O ports. Multiplexed address/data. The Intel 8755A-2 is the 5 MHz version. That version was available for US$81.00 in quantity of 100. There was an Industrial Grade version Intel I8755A-8.

=== RAM controllers ===
- 8202 – Dynamic RAM Controller. This supports the Intel 2104A, 2117, or 2118 DRAM modules, up to 128 KB of DRAM modules. Price was reduced to US$36.25 for quantities of 100 for the D8202 package style around May 1979.
- 8203 – Dynamic RAM Controller. The Intel 82C03 CMOS version dissipates less than 25 mA. It supports up to 32x 64K-bit RAM for a total capacity of up to 256 KB. It refreshes every 10 to 16 microseconds. It supports multiplexing of row and column memory addresses. It generates strobes to latch the address internally. It arbitrates between simultaneous requests for memory access and refresh. It also acknowledges memory-access cycles to the system CPU. The 82C03 was available in either ceramic or plastic packages for US$32.00 in 100 pieces quantity.
- 8207 – DRAM Controller

=== Periphery ===
- 8205 – 1 of 8 Binary Decoder
- 8206 – Error Detection & Correction Unit
- 8210 – TTL To MOS Shifter & High Voltage Clock Driver
- 8212 – 8-bit I/O Port. The industrial version of ID8212 was available for US$6.75 in quantities of 100.
- 8216 – 4-bit Parallel Bidirectional Bus Driver. The industrial version of ID8216 was available for US$6.40 in quantities of 100.
- 8218/8219 – Bus Controller
- 8226 – 4-bit Parallel Bidirectional Bus Driver. The industrial version of ID8226 was available for US$6.40 in quantities of 100.
- 8237 – DMA Controller
- 8251 – USART Communication Controller
- 8253 – Programmable Interval Timer
- 8254 – Programmable Interval Timer. The 82C54 CMOS version was outsourced to Oki Electronic Industry Co., Ltd.
- 8255 – Programmable Peripheral Interface
- 8256 – Multifunction Peripheral. This multifunction chip uses Serial Communications, Parallel I/O, Counter/Timers and Interrupts. The Intel 8256AH was available for US$21.40 in quantities of 100. This integrated circuit chip integrates the chips with the following functionality:
  - Intel 8251A Programmable Communications Interface
  - Intel 8253 Programmable Interval Timer
  - Intel 8255A Programmable Peripheral Interface
  - Intel 8259A Programmable Interrupt Controller.
- 8257 – DMA Controller
- 8259 – Programmable Interrupt Controller
- 8271 – Programmable Floppy Disk Controller
- 8272 – Single/Double Density Floppy Disk Controller. It is compatible with IBM 3740 and System 34 formats and provides both Frequency Modulation (FM) or Modified Frequency Modulation (MFM). This version was available for US$38.10 in quantities of 100.
- 8273 – Programmable HDLC/SDLC Protocol Controller. This device supports ISO/CCITT's HDLC and IBM's SDLC communication protocols. These were available for US$33.75 (4 MHz) and US$30.00 (8 MHz) in quantities of 100.
- 8274 – Multi-Protocol Serial Controller. This support three different protocols using the following feature of Asynchronous Operation, Byte Synchronous Operation and Bit Synchronous Operation. The Byte Synchronous mode is compatible to IBM's Bisync signal protocol. The Bit Synchronous mode is compatible to IBM's SDLC and the International Standards Organization's HDLC protocol and is compatible with CCITT X.25 international standard as well. It was packaged in 40-pin product using the Intel's HMOS technology. The available version is rated up to 880 kilobaud for US$30.30 in the quantities of 100. NEC μPD7201 was also compatible.
- 8275 – Programmable CRT Controller. It refreshes the raster scan display by buffering from main memory and keeping track of the display portion. This version was available for US$32.00 in quantities of 100.
- 8276 – Small System CRT Controller
- 8278 – Programmable Key Board Interface
- 8279 – Key Board/Display Controller
- 8282 – 8-bit Non-Inverting Latch with Output Buffer
- 8283 – 8-bit Inverting Latch with Output Buffer
- 8291 – GPIB Talker/Listener. This controller can operate from 1 to 8 MHz. It was available for US$23.75 in quantities of 100.
- 8292 – GPIB Controller. Designed around Intel 8041A which it has been programmed as an controller interface element. It also controls the bus using three lock-up timers to detect issues on the GPIB bus interface. It was available for US$21.25 in quantities of 100.
- 8293 – GPIB Transceiver. This chipset supports up to 4 different modes: Mode 0 Talker/Listener Control Lines, Mode 1 Talker/Listener/Controller Control Lines, Mode 2 Talker/Listener/Controller Data Lines, and Mode 3 Talker/Listener Data Lines. It was available for US$11.50 in quantities of 100. At the time of release, it was available in samples then full production in the first quarter of 1980.
- 8294 – Data Encryption/Decryption Unit + 1 O/P Port. It encrypts and decrypts 64-bit blocks of data using the Federal Information Processing Data Encryption Standard algorithm. This also uses the National Bureau of Standards encryption algorithm. This DEU operates using a 56-bit user-specified key to generate 64-bit cipher words. It was available for US$22.50 in quantities of 100.
- 8295 – Dot Matrix Printer Controller. This interfaces with LRC 7040 Series dot matrix printers and other small printers as well. It was available for US$20.65 in quantities of 100.

== Educational use ==
In many engineering schools the 8085 processor is used in introductory microprocessor courses. Trainer kits composed of a printed circuit board, 8085, and supporting hardware are offered by various companies. These kits usually include complete documentation allowing a student to go from soldering to assembly language programming in a single course. Also, the architecture and instruction set of the 8085 are easy for a student to understand. Shared Project versions of educational and hobby 8085-based single-board computers are noted below in the External Links section of this article.

== Simulators ==
Software simulators are available for the 8085 microprocessor, which allow simulated execution of opcodes in a graphical environment.

== See also ==
- IBM System/23 Datamaster gave IBM designers familiarity with the 8085 support chips used in the IBM PC.
