= FLAGS register =

Status register of x86 architecture

The FLAGS register is the status register that contains the current state of an x86 CPU. The size and meanings of the flag bits are architecture dependent. It usually reflects the result of arithmetic operations as well as information about restrictions placed on the CPU operation at the current time. Some of those restrictions may include preventing some interrupts from triggering, prohibition of execution of a class of "privileged" instructions. Additional status flags may bypass memory mapping and define what action the CPU should take on arithmetic overflow.

The carry, parity, auxiliary carry (or half carry), zero and sign flags are included in many architectures (many modern (RISC) architectures do not have flags, such as carry, and even if they do use flags, then half carry is rare, since BCD math is no longer common, and it even has limited support on long mode on x86-64).

In the Intel 8086, the register is 16 bits wide. Its successors, the EFLAGS and RFLAGS registers (in modern x86-64), are 32 bits and 64 bits wide, respectively. The wider registers retain compatibility with their smaller predecessors.

== FLAGS ==
Intel x86 FLAGS register
Bit #	Mask	Abbreviation	Description	Category	=1	=0
FLAGS
0	0x0001	CF	Carry flag	Status	CY (Carry)	NC (No Carry)
1	0x0002	B̅R̅K̅I̅	I/O Trap (NEC V25/V35/V55 only), reserved and always 1 in EFLAGS on all other x86 processors	Control	(NEC only); I/O permitted	(NEC only); I/O trapped
2	0x0004	PF	Parity flag	Status	PE (Parity Even)	PO (Parity Odd)
3	0x0008	—	Reserved	—		
4	0x0010	AF	Auxiliary Carry flag	Status	AC (Auxiliary Carry)	NA (No Auxiliary Carry)
5	0x0020	—	Reserved	—		
6	0x0040	ZF	Zero flag	Status	ZR (Zero)	NZ (Not Zero)
7	0x0080	SF	Sign flag	Status	NG (Negative)	PL (Positive)
8	0x0100	TF	Trap flag (single step)	Control		
9	0x0200	IF	Interrupt enable flag	Control	EI (Enable Interrupt)	DI (Disable Interrupt)
10	0x0400	DF	Direction flag	Control	DN (Down)	UP (Up)
11	0x0800	OF	Overflow flag	Status	OV (Overflow)	NV (Not Overflow)
12–13	0x3000	IOPL	I/O privilege level (286+ only), always all-1s on 8086 and 186	System		
14	0x4000	NT	Nested task flag (286+ only), always 1 on 8086 and 186	System		
15	0x8000	MD	Mode flag (NEC V-series only), reserved on all Intel CPUs. Always 1 on 8086/186, 0 on 286 and later.	Control	(NEC only); Native Mode (186 compatible)	(NEC only); Emulation Mode (8080 compatible)
EFLAGS
16	0x0001 0000	RF	Resume flag (386+ only)	System		
17	0x0002 0000	VM	Virtual 8086 mode flag (386+ only)	System		
18	0x0004 0000	AC	Alignment Check (486+, ring 3), SMAP Access Check (Broadwell+, ring 0-2)	System		
19	0x0008 0000	VIF	Virtual interrupt flag (Pentium+)	System		
20	0x0010 0000	VIP	Virtual interrupt pending (Pentium+)	System		
21	0x0020 0000	ID	Able to use CPUID instruction (Pentium+)	System		
22–29	0x3FC0 0000	—	Reserved	—		
30	0x4000 0000	(none)	AES key schedule loaded flag (VIA C3/C7 CPUs with VIA PadLock only) (Note: VIA Nano and later VIA/Zhaoxin processors with support for PadLock no longer use bit 30 of EFLAGS.)	System		
31	0x8000 0000	AI	Alternate Instruction Set enabled (VIA C5XL processors only)	System		
31	0x8000 0000	RX32	"REX32" (an alternate to compatibility mode that allows access to 16 GPRs)			
RFLAGS
32‑63	0xFFFF FFFF… …0000 0000	—	Reserved	—		

Note: The mask column in the table is the AND bitmask (as hexadecimal value) to query the flag(s) within FLAGS register value.

== Usage ==
All FLAGS registers contain the condition codes, flag bits that let the results of one machine-language instruction affect another instruction. Arithmetic and logical instructions set some or all of the flags, and conditional jump instructions take variable action based on the value of certain flags. For example, jz (Jump if Zero), jc (Jump if Carry), and jo (Jump if Overflow) depend on specific flags. Other conditional jumps test combinations of several flags.

FLAGS registers can be moved from or to the stack. This is part of the job of saving and restoring CPU context, against a routine such as an interrupt service routine whose changes to registers should not be seen by the calling code. Here are the relevant instructions:

- The PUSHF and POPF instructions transfer the 16-bit FLAGS register.
- PUSHFD/POPFD (introduced with the i386 architecture) transfer the 32-bit double register EFLAGS.
- PUSHFQ/POPFQ (introduced with the x86-64 architecture) transfer the 64-bit quadword register RFLAGS.

In 64-bit mode, PUSHF/POPF and PUSHFQ/POPFQ are available but PUSHFD/POPFD are not.

The lower 8 bits of the FLAGS register is also open to direct load/store manipulation by SAHF and LAHF (load/store AH into flags).

=== Example ===
The ability to push and pop FLAGS registers lets a program manipulate information in the FLAGS in ways for which machine-language instructions do not exist. For example, the cld and std instructions clear and set the direction flag (DF), respectively; but there is no instruction to complement DF. This can be achieved with the following assembly code:

               ; This is 8086 code, with 16-bit registers pushed onto the stack,
               ; and the flags register is only 16 bits with this CPU.
pushf          ; Use the stack to transfer the FLAGS
pop   ax       ; … into the AX register
push  ax       ; and copy them back onto the stack for storage
xor   ax, 400h ; Toggle (invert, ‘complement’) the DF only; other bits are unchanged
push  ax       ; Use the stack again to move the modified value
popf           ; … into the FLAGS register
; Insert here the code that required the DF flag to be complemented
popf          ; Restore the original value of the FLAGS

By manipulating the FLAGS register, a program can determine the model of the installed processor. For example, the alignment flag can only be changed on the 486 and above. If the program tries to modify this flag and senses that the modification did not persist, the processor is earlier than the 486.

Starting with the Intel Pentium, the CPUID instruction reports the processor model. However, the above method remains useful to distinguish between earlier models.

== See also ==
- Bit field
- Control register
- CPU flag (x86)
- Program status word
- Status register
- x86 assembly language
- x86 instruction listings
