= Bit Test =

Instruction for x86 processors

The BT x86 assembly language instruction stands for Bit Test and was added to the x86 instruction set with the 80386 processor. BT copies a bit from a given register to the carry flag.

Example: copy the third least significant bit from EAX to the carry flag

BT EAX, 2

BTS (Bit Test and Set) operates the same, but also sets the bit in the register, while BTR (Bit Test and Reset) resets it, and BTC (Bit Test and Complement) flips it.

Logical Explanation BT

  BT SRC, POSITION

  SRC
     Represent as bits array

  POSITION
     Represent as numeric position
     From Right to Left
     Start at 0

  CF
     Carry Flag

  Result
     CF = SRC[POSITION]

Logical Explanation BTC

  BTC SRC, POSITION

  SRC
     Represent as bits array for CF Result
     Represent as hex for SRC Result

  POSITION
     Represent as numeric position
     From Right to Left
     Start at 0

  CF
     Carry Flag

  Result
     CF = SRC[POSITION]
     XOR SRC, POW(2,POSITION)
