= Half-carry flag =

Binary/decimal adjustment flag bit in some computer processors

A half-carry flag (also known as an auxiliary flag) is a condition flag bit in the status register of many CPU families, such as the Intel 8080, Zilog Z80, the x86, and the Atmel AVR series, among others. It indicates when a carry or borrow has been generated out of the least significant four bits of the accumulator register following the execution of an arithmetic instruction. It is primarily used in decimal (BCD) arithmetic instructions.

== Usage ==
Normally, a processor that uses binary arithmetic (which includes almost all modern CPUs) will add two 8-bit byte values according to the rules of simple binary addition. For example, adding 25_{16} and 48_{16} produces 6D_{16}. However, for binary-coded decimal (BCD) values, where each 4-bit nibble represents a decimal digit, addition is more complicated. For example, adding the decimal value 25 and 48, which are encoded as the BCD values 25_{16} and 48_{16}, the binary addition of the two values produces 6D_{16}. Since the lower nibble of this value is a non-decimal digit (D), it must be adjusted by adding 06_{16} to produce the correct BCD result of 73_{16}, which represents the decimal value 73.

  0010 0101   25
+ 0100 1000   48
-----------
  0110 1101   6D, intermediate result
+      0110   06, adjustment
-----------
  0111 0011   73, adjusted result

Likewise, adding the BCD values 39_{16} and 48_{16} produces 81_{16}. This result does not have a non-decimal low nibble, but it does cause a carry out of the least significant digit (lower four bits) into the most significant digit (upper four bits). This is indicated by the CPU setting the half-carry flag. This value must also be corrected, by adding 06_{16} to 81_{16} to produce a corrected BCD result of 87_{16}.

  0011 1001   39
+ 0100 1000   48
-----------
  1000 0001   81, intermediate result
+      0110   06, adjustment
-----------
  1000 0111   87, adjusted result

Finally, if an addition results in a non-decimal high digit, then 60_{16} must be added to the value to produce the correct BCD result. For example, adding 72_{16} and 73_{16} produces E5_{16}. Since the most significant digit of this sum is non-decimal (E), adding 60_{16} to it produces a corrected BCD result of 145_{16}. (Note that the leading 1 digit is actually a carry bit.)

  0111 0010   72
+ 0111 0011   73
-----------
  1110 0101   E5, intermediate result
+ 0110        60, adjustment
-----------
1 0100 0101  145, adjusted result

Summarizing, if the result of a binary addition contains a non-decimal low digit or causes the half-carry flag to be set, the result must be corrected by adding 06_{16} to it; if the result contains a non-decimal high digit, the result must be further corrected by adding 60_{16} to produce the correct final BCD value.

== The Auxiliary Carry Flag in x86 ==
Intel 8086 CPU status register
^{1}_{5}	^{1}_{4}	^{1}_{3}	^{1}_{2}	^{1}_{1}	^{1}_{0}	^{0}_{9}	^{0}_{8}	^{0}_{7}	^{0}_{6}	^{0}_{5}	^{0}_{4}	^{0}_{3}	^{0}_{2}	^{0}_{1}	^{0}_{0}	(bit position)
-	-	-	-	O	D	I	T	S	Z	-	A	-	P	-	C	Flags

The Auxiliary Carry Flag (AF) is a CPU flag in the FLAGS register of all x86-compatible CPUs, and the preceding 8080-family. It has occasionally been called the Adjust Flag by Intel. The flag bit is located at position 4 in the CPU flag register. It indicates when an arithmetic carry or borrow has been generated out of the four least significant bits, or lower nibble. It is primarily used to support binary-coded decimal (BCD) arithmetic.

The Auxiliary Carry flag is set (to 1) if during an "add" operation there is a carry from the low nibble (lowest four bits) to the high nibble (upper four bits), or a borrow from the high nibble to the low nibble, in the low-order 8-bit portion, during a subtraction. Otherwise, if no such carry or borrow occurs, the flag is cleared.

== See also ==
- Carry flag
- Intel BCD opcodes
