= Condition code =

Condition code can refer to:

- Condition code register, in computing
- Uncertainty parameter, in astronomy
