= Direction flag =

The direction flag is a flag that controls the left-to-right or right-to-left direction of string processing, stored in the FLAGS register on all x86-compatible CPUs. It is bit number 10.

This flag is used to determine the direction ('forward' or 'backward') in which several bytes of data will be copied from one place in the memory, to another. The direction is important mainly when the original data position in memory and the target data position overlap.

- If it is set to 0 (using the clear-direction-flag instruction CLD) — it means that string is processed beginning from lowest to highest address; such instructions mode is called auto-incrementing mode. Both the source index and destination index (like MOVS) will increase them;
- In case it is set to 1 (using the set-direction-flag instruction STD) — the string is processed from highest to lowest address. This is called auto-decrementing mode.

x86-instruction	Meaning	Flag	Notes	
x86-instruction	Meaning	Flag	Direction of string processing	Mode title
CLD	clear direction flag	0	lowest-to-highest address	auto-incrementing
STD	set direction flag	1	highest-to-lowest address	auto-decrementing
