= Trap flag =

A trap flag permits operation of a processor in single-step mode. If such a flag is available, debuggers can use it to step through the execution of a computer program.

The trap flag, when set, causes the machine to trap after executing one instruction. The trap handler can cause a debugger to be notified; the debugger can then inspect the contents of registers and memory locations and either continue or stop and let the user of the debugger examine additional data in the program.
