= Multiplexing =

Method of combining multiple signals into one signal over a shared medium

Multiple low data rate signals are multiplexed over a single high-data-rate link, then demultiplexed at the other end.

In telecommunications and computer networking, multiplexing (sometimes contracted to muxing) is a method by which multiple analog or digital signals are combined into one signal over a transmission medium. It allows the same medium to be shared between multiple users. The aim is to share a scarce resource—a physical transmission medium. For example, in telecommunications, several telephone calls may be carried using one wire. Multiplexing originated in telegraphy in the 1870s, and is now widely applied in communications. In telephony, George Owen Squier is credited with the development of telephone carrier multiplexing in 1910.

The multiplexed signal is transmitted over a communication channel such as a cable. The multiplexing divides the capacity of the communication channel into several logical channels, one for each message signal or data stream to be transferred. A reverse process, known as demultiplexing, extracts the original channels on the receiver end.

A device that performs the multiplexing is called a multiplexer (MUX), and a device that performs the reverse process is called a demultiplexer (DEMUX or DMX).

Inverse multiplexing (IMUX) has the opposite aim as multiplexing, namely to break one data stream into several streams, transfer them simultaneously over several communication channels, and recreate the original data stream.

In computing, I/O multiplexing can also be used to refer to the concept of processing multiple input/output events from a single event loop, with system calls like poll and select (Unix).

== Types ==
Multiple variable bit rate digital bit streams may be transferred efficiently over a single fixed bandwidth channel by means of statistical multiplexing. This is an asynchronous mode time-domain multiplexing which is a form of time-division multiplexing.

Digital bit streams can be transferred over an analog channel by means of code-division multiplexing techniques such as frequency-hopping spread spectrum (FHSS) and direct-sequence spread spectrum (DSSS).

In wireless communications, multiplexing can also be accomplished through alternating polarization (horizontal/vertical or clockwise/counterclockwise) on each adjacent channel and satellite, or through phased multi-antenna array combined with a multiple-input multiple-output communications (MIMO) scheme.

=== Space-division multiplexing ===
In wired communication, space-division multiplexing, also known as space-division multiple access (SDMA) is the use of separate point-to-point electrical conductors for each transmitted channel. Examples include an analog stereo audio cable, with one pair of wires for the left channel and another for the right channel, and a multi-pair telephone cable, a switched star network such as a telephone access network, a switched Ethernet network, and a mesh network.

In wireless communication, space-division multiplexing is achieved with multiple antenna elements forming a phased array antenna. Examples are multiple-input and multiple-output (MIMO), single-input and multiple-output (SIMO) and multiple-input and single-output (MISO) multiplexing. An IEEE 802.11g wireless router with k antennas makes it in principle possible to communicate with k multiplexed channels, each with a peak bit rate of 54 Mbit/s, thus increasing the total peak bit rate by the factor k. Different antennas would give different multi-path propagation (echo) signatures, making it possible for digital signal processing techniques to separate different signals from each other. These techniques may also be utilized for space diversity (improved robustness to fading) or beamforming (improved selectivity) rather than multiplexing.

=== Frequency-division multiplexing ===
Frequency-division multiplexing (FDM): The spectrum of each input signal is shifted to a distinct frequency range.

Frequency-division multiplexing (FDM) is inherently an analog technology. FDM achieves the combining of several signals into one medium by sending signals in several distinct frequency ranges over a single medium. In FDM the signals are electrical signals. One of the most common applications for FDM is traditional radio and television broadcasting from terrestrial, mobile or satellite stations, or cable television. Only one cable reaches a customer's residential area, but the service provider can send multiple television channels or signals simultaneously over that cable to all subscribers without interference. Receivers must tune to the appropriate frequency (channel) to access the desired signal.

One stream, one color, light waves, in WDM

A variant technology, called wavelength-division multiplexing (WDM) is used in optical communications.

=== Time-division multiplexing ===
Time-division multiplexing (TDM)

Time-division multiplexing (TDM) is a digital (or in rare cases, analog) technology that uses time, instead of space or frequency, to separate the different data streams. TDM involves sequencing groups of a few bits or bytes from each individual input stream, one after the other, and in such a way that they can be associated with the appropriate receiver. If done sufficiently quickly, the receiving devices will not detect that some of the circuit time was used to serve another logical communication path.

Consider an application requiring four terminals at an airport to reach a central computer. Each terminal communicated at 2400 baud, so rather than acquire four individual circuits to carry such a low-speed transmission, the airline has installed a pair of multiplexers. A pair of 9600 baud modems and one dedicated analog communications circuit from the airport ticket desk back to the airline data center are also installed. Some web proxy servers (e.g. polipo) use TDM in HTTP pipelining of multiple HTTP transactions onto the same TCP/IP connection.

Carrier-sense multiple access and multidrop communication methods are similar to time-division multiplexing in that multiple data streams are separated by time on the same medium, but because the signals have separate origins instead of being combined into a single signal, are best viewed as channel access methods, rather than a form of multiplexing.

TD is a legacy multiplexing technology still providing the backbone of most National fixed-line telephony networks in Europe, providing the 2 Mbit/s voice and signaling ports on narrow-band telephone exchanges such as the DMS100. Each E1 or 2 Mbit/s TDM port provides either 30 or 31 speech timeslots in the case of CCITT7 signaling systems and 30 voice channels for customer-connected Q931, DASS2, DPNSS, V5 and CASS signaling systems.

=== Polarization-division multiplexing ===
Polarization-division multiplexing uses the polarization of electromagnetic radiation to separate orthogonal channels. It is in practical use in both radio and optical communications, particularly in 100 Gbit/s per channel fiber-optic transmission systems.

Differential Cross-Polarized Wireless Communications is a novel method for polarized antenna transmission utilizing a differential technique.

=== Orbital angular momentum multiplexing ===
Orbital angular momentum multiplexing is a relatively new and experimental technique for multiplexing multiple channels of signals carried using electromagnetic radiation over a single path. It can potentially be used in addition to other physical multiplexing methods to greatly expand the transmission capacity of such systems. As of 2012 it is still in its early research phase, with small-scale laboratory demonstrations of bandwidths of up to 2.5 Tbit/s over a single light path. This is a controversial subject in the academic community, with many claiming it is not a new method of multiplexing, but rather a special case of space-division multiplexing.

=== Code-division multiplexing ===
Code-division multiplexing (CDM), code-division multiple access (CDMA) or spread spectrum is a class of techniques where several channels simultaneously share the same frequency spectrum, and this spectral bandwidth is much higher than the bit rate or symbol rate. One form is frequency hopping, another is direct sequence spread spectrum. In the latter case, each channel transmits its bits as a coded channel-specific sequence of pulses called chips. Number of chips per bit, or chips per symbol, is the spreading factor. This coded transmission typically is accomplished by transmitting a unique time-dependent series of short pulses, which are placed within chip times within the larger bit time. All channels, each with a different code, can be transmitted on the same fiber or radio channel or other medium, and asynchronously demultiplexed. Advantages over conventional techniques are that variable bandwidth is possible (just as in statistical multiplexing), that the wide bandwidth allows poor signal-to-noise ratio according to Shannon–Hartley theorem, and that multi-path propagation in wireless communication can be combated by rake receivers.

A significant application of CDMA is the Global Positioning System (GPS).

Telecommunication multiplexing

== Multiple access method ==
A multiplexing technique may be further extended into a multiple access method or channel access method, for example, TDM into time-division multiple access (TDMA) and statistical multiplexing into carrier-sense multiple access (CSMA). A multiple-access method makes it possible for several transmitters connected to the same physical medium to share their capacity.

Multiplexing is provided by the physical layer of the OSI model, while multiple access also involves a media access control protocol, which is part of the data link layer.

The Transport layer in the OSI model, as well as TCP/IP model, provides statistical multiplexing of several application layer data flows to/from the same computer.

Code-division multiplexing (CDM) is a technique in which each channel transmits its bits as a coded channel-specific sequence of pulses. This coded transmission is typically accomplished by transmitting a unique time-dependent series of short pulses, which are placed within chip times within the larger bit time. All channels, each with a different code, can be transmitted on the same fiber and asynchronously demultiplexed. Other widely used multiple access techniques are time-division multiple access (TDMA) and frequency-division multiple access (FDMA). Code-division multiplex techniques are used as an access technology, namely code-division multiple access (CDMA), in Universal Mobile Telecommunications System (UMTS) standard for the third-generation (3G) mobile communication identified by the ITU.

== Application areas ==
=== Telegraphy ===
The earliest communication technology using electrical wires, and therefore sharing an interest in the economies afforded by multiplexing, was the electric telegraph. Early experiments allowed two separate messages to travel in opposite directions simultaneously, first using an electric battery at both ends, then at only one end.

Émile Baudot developed a time-multiplexing system of multiple Hughes machines in the 1870s. In 1874, the quadruplex telegraph developed by Thomas Edison transmitted two messages in each direction simultaneously, for a total of four messages transiting the same wire at the same time. Several researchers were investigating acoustic telegraphy, a frequency-division multiplexing technique, which led to the invention of the telephone.

=== Telephony ===
In telephony, a customer's telephone line now typically ends at the remote concentrator box, where it is multiplexed along with other telephone lines for that neighborhood or other similar area. The multiplexed signal is then carried to the central switching office on significantly fewer wires and for much further distances than a customer's line can practically go. This is likewise also true for digital subscriber lines (DSL).

Fiber in the loop (FITL) is a common method of multiplexing, which uses optical fiber as the backbone. It not only connects POTS phone lines with the rest of the PSTN, but also replaces DSL by connecting directly to Ethernet wired into the home. Asynchronous Transfer Mode is often the communications protocol used.

Cable TV has long carried multiplexed television channels, and late in the 20th century began offering the same services as telephone companies. IPTV also depends on multiplexing.

=== Video processing ===
In video editing and processing systems, multiplexing refers to the process of interleaving audio and video into one coherent data stream.

In digital video, such a transport stream is normally a feature of a container format which may include metadata and other information, such as subtitles. The audio and video streams may have variable bit rate. Software that produces such a transport stream and/or container is commonly called a multiplexer or muxer. A demuxer is software that extracts or otherwise makes available for separate processing the components of such a stream or container.

=== Digital broadcasting ===
In digital television systems, several variable bit-rate data streams are multiplexed together to a fixed bit-rate transport stream by means of statistical multiplexing. This makes it possible to transfer several video and audio channels simultaneously over the same frequency channel, together with various services. This may involve several standard-definition television (SDTV) programs (particularly on DVB-T, DVB-S2, ISDB and ATSC-C), or one HDTV, possibly with a single SDTV companion channel over one 6 to 8 MHz-wide TV channel. The device that accomplishes this is called a statistical multiplexer. In several of these systems, the multiplexing results in an MPEG transport stream. The newer DVB standards DVB-S2 and DVB-T2 has the capacity to carry several HDTV channels in one multiplex.

In digital radio, a multiplex (also known as an ensemble) is a number of radio stations that are grouped together. A multiplex is a stream of digital information that includes audio and other data.

On communications satellites which carry broadcast television networks and radio networks, this is known as multiple channel per carrier or MCPC. Where multiplexing is not practical (such as where there are different sources using a single transponder), single channel per carrier mode is used.

=== Analog broadcasting ===
In FM broadcasting and other analog radio media, multiplexing is a term commonly given to the process of adding subcarriers to the audio signal before it enters the transmitter, where modulation occurs. (In fact, the stereo multiplex signal can be generated using time-division multiplexing, by switching between the two (left channel and right channel) input signals at an ultrasonic rate (the subcarrier), and then filtering out the higher harmonics.) Multiplexing in this sense is sometimes known as MPX, which in turn is also an old term for stereophonic FM, seen on stereo systems since the 1960s.

== Other meanings ==
In spectroscopy the term is used to indicate that the experiment is performed with a mixture of frequencies at once and their respective response unraveled afterward using the Fourier transform principle.

In computer programming, it may refer to using a single in-memory resource (such as a file handle) to handle multiple external resources (such as on-disk files).

Some electrical multiplexing techniques do not require a physical "multiplexer" device, they refer to a "keyboard matrix" or "Charlieplexing" design style:

- Multiplexing may refer to the design of a multiplexed display (non-multiplexed displays are immune to break up).
- Multiplexing may refer to the design of a "switch matrix" (non-multiplexed buttons are immune to "phantom keys" and also immune to "phantom key blocking").

In high-throughput DNA sequencing, the term is used to indicate that some artificial sequences (often called barcodes or indexes) have been added to link given sequence reads to a given sample, and thus allow for the sequencing of multiple samples in the same reaction.

In sociolinguistics, multiplexity is used to describe the number of distinct connections between individuals who are part of a social network. A multiplex network is one in which members share a number of ties stemming from more than one social context, such as workmates, neighbors, or relatives.

== See also ==
- Add-drop multiplexer
- Channel bank
- Multiplexed display
- Optical add-drop multiplexer
- Orthogonal frequency-division multiplexing (OFDM) (which is a modulation method)
- Statistical multiplexing
