= BeamWars =

1992 video game

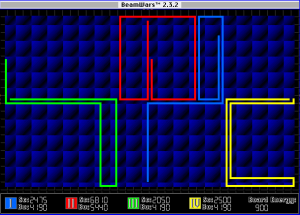
- Developer(s): Steve Crutchfield
- Publisher(s): Polaris Software
- Platform(s): Mac OS
- Release: 1992
- Genre(s): Snake
- Mode(s): Multiplayer

BeamWars is a Macintosh snake game released as shareware in 1992 by Steve Crutchfield. It allows up to four people to play simultaneously on a single keyboard.

== Gameplay ==
The player controls a beam of light which is capable of moving up, down, left or right. The objective is to avoid hitting anything while forcing your opponents' beams to crash into yours, their own, or a wall. After a set amount of time, the walls begin to close in, making survival more difficult and forcing players closer together. The winner of each round is the last surviving beam and points are awarded based on how long each beam survived. After a few rounds, the player with the highest score wins the game. The game supports a maximum of 4 players, either human or computer controlled (which can be set to either Novice or Expert level). However, since the game could be played with 4 humans at the same time on the same keyboard, it was prone to the N-key rollover problem.

== Reception ==
Prominent among the first generation of games requiring color and the Macintosh II series, BeamWars was described as the "third best Macintosh Shareware game of all time" in 1992. The MacUser Guide to Shareware (1993) stated "BeamWars stands out as one of the finest arcade-type games, commercial or shareware, ever written for the Macintosh" and described the game as "a delightful, nerve-wracking combination of sound, skill, and color."
