= Multiplexed display =

Electronic display devices where the entire display is not driven at once

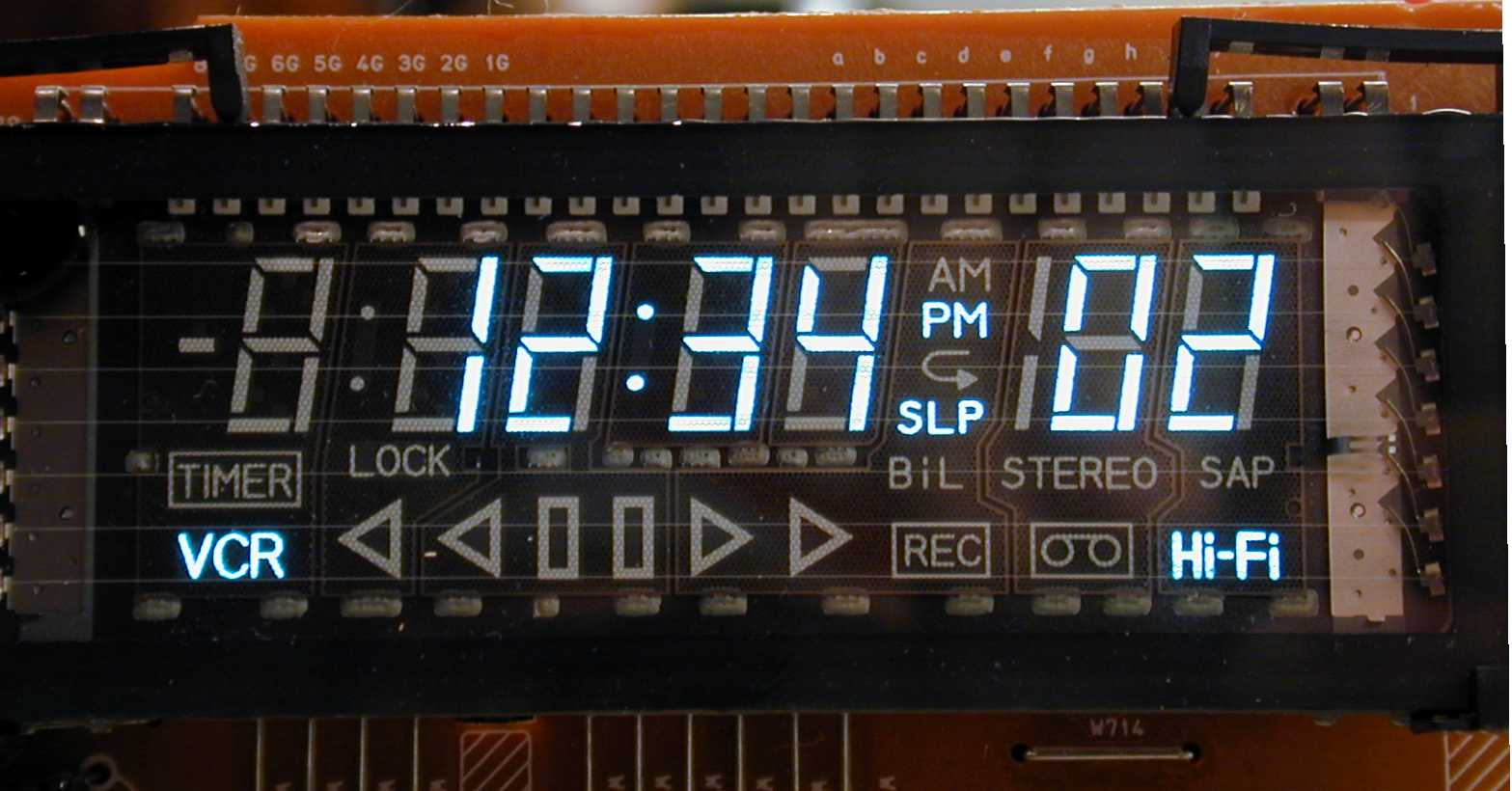
An entirely-typical multiplexed vacuum fluorescent display used in a videocassette recorder

Multiplexed displays are electronic display devices where the entire display is not driven at one time.

Instead, sub-units of the display (typically, rows or columns for a dot matrix display or individual characters for a character oriented display, occasionally individual display elements) are multiplexed, that is, driven one at a time, but the high switching frequency and the persistence of vision combine to make the viewer believe the entire display is continuously active.

A multiplexed display has several advantages compared to a non-multiplexed display:

- fewer wires (often, far fewer wires) are needed
- simpler driving electronics can be used
- both lead to reduced cost
- reduced power consumption

Multiplexed displays can be divided into two broad categories:

1. character-oriented displays
2. pixel-oriented displays

== Character-oriented displays ==
Scanning by columns at fast-enough frequencies cause the number "1.234" to appear static, due to the persistence of vision optical illusion.

Most character-oriented displays (such as seven-segment displays, fourteen-segment displays, and sixteen-segment displays) display an entire character at one time. The various segments of each character are connected in a two-dimensional diode matrix and will only illuminate if both the "row" and "column" lines of the matrix are at the correct electrical potential. The light-emitting element normally takes the form of a light-emitting diode (LED) so electricity will only flow in one direction, keeping the individual "row" and "column" lines of the matrix electrically isolated from each other. For liquid crystal displays, the intersection of the row and column is not conductive at all.

In the example of the VCR vacuum fluorescent display shown above, the illuminated elements are the plates of many individual triode vacuum tubes sharing the same vacuum enclosure. The grids of the triodes are arranged so that only one digit is illuminated at a time. All of the similar plates in all of the digits (for example, all of the lower-left plates in all of the digits) are connected in parallel. One by one, the microprocessor driving the display enables a digit by placing a positive voltage on that digit's grid and then placing a positive voltage on the appropriate plates. Electrons flow through that digit's grid and strike those plates that are at a positive potential.

If the display had been built with every segment being individually connected, the display would have required 49 wires just for the digits, with more wires being needed for all of the other indicators that can be illuminated. By multiplexing the display, only seven "digit selector" lines and seven "segment selector" lines are needed. The extra indicators (in our example, "VCR", "Hi-Fi", "STEREO", "SAP", etc.) are arranged as if they were segments of an additional digit or two or extra segments of existing digits and are scanned using the same multiplexed strategy as the real digits.

Most character-oriented displays drive all the appropriate segments of an entire digit simultaneously. A few character-oriented displays drive only one segment at a time. The display on the Hewlett-Packard HP-35 was an example of this. The calculator took advantage of an effect of pulsed LED operation where very brief pulses of light are perceived as brighter than a longer pulse of light with the same time-integral of intensity.

A keyboard matrix circuit has a very similar arrangement as a multiplexed display, and has many of the same advantages. In order to reduce the number of wires even further, some people "share" wires between a multiplexed display and a keyboard matrix, reducing the number of wires even further.

== Pixel-oriented displays ==
A LED matrix display scanning by rows to make the letter W

By comparison, in dot-matrix displays, individual pixels are located at the intersections of the matrix's "row" and "column" lines and each pixel can be individually controlled.

Here, the savings in wiring becomes far more dramatic. For a typical 1024×768 (XGA) computer screen, 2,359,297 wires would be needed for non-multiplexed control. That many wires would be completely impractical. But by arranging the pixels into a multiplexed matrix, only 3,328 wires are needed; a more practical situation.

Pixel-oriented displays may drive a single pixel at a time or an entire row or column of pixels simultaneously. Active-matrix liquid crystal displays provide a storage element at each pixel so that the pixel continues to display the correct state even when not being actively driven.

== "Break up" ==
Because most multiplexed displays do not present the entire display simultaneously, they are subject to "break up" if the observer's point of regard is in motion. For example, if the observer were to rapidly swing their vision across a multiplexed display, they might see a jumble of individual digits rather than a coherent display. (The same effect can occur if the display is moving with respect to the observer's point of regard.) People with nystagmus (involuntary eye movement) are much more likely to experience the effect and may find some multiplexed displays hard to read. It can also sometimes be provoked by chewing hard candy; this causes vibration of the user's eyes, leading to the break-up of the display.

The multiplexed nature of a display can also be revealed by observing it through a mechanical stroboscope, for example, a spinning slotted wheel.

== See also ==
- Charlieplexing
