= Antiparallel (electronics) =

In electronics, two anti-parallel or inverse-parallel devices are connected in parallel but with their polarities reversed.

One example is the TRIAC, which is comparable to two thyristors connected back-to-back (in other words, reverse parallel), but on a single piece of silicon.

Two LEDs can be paired this way, so that each protects the other from reverse voltage. A series string of such pairs can be connected to AC or DC power, with an appropriate resistor. Some two-color LEDs are constructed this way, with the 2 dies connected anti-parallel in one chip package. With AC, the LEDs in each pair take turns emitting light, on alternate half-cycles of supply power, greatly reducing the strobing effect to below the normal flicker fusion threshold of the human eye, and making the lights brighter. On DC, polarity can be switched back and forth so as to change the color of the lights, such as in Christmas lights that can be either white or colored.

Battery-powered lights, which are wired in parallel, can also create a simulated "chasing" effect by alternating the polarity for each LED attached to the string, and controlling the positive and negative parts of the cycle separately. This creates two "virtual circuits", with odd-numbered LEDs lighting on positive polarity and even-numbered ones on negative polarity, for example. By eliminating the need for extra wires, this reduces costs for the manufacturer, and makes the cords less bulky and obvious for the consumer to string on decorative items. On cheaper sets, this causes strobing and prevents any of the LEDs from getting to full brightness, since both polarities share the same wire pair and cannot be active at the same time, meaning each can only be on during its own half of the cycle. Better lights can adjust the duty cycle so that any unused "off" time on one polarity can be used by the other, reducing the strobing effect and making it easier to create color blends (such as orange, amber, and yellow from a red/green LED).

== ESD ==
Antiparallel diodes are often used for ESD protection in ICs. Different ground or supply domains at the same potential or voltage may be wired separately for isolation reasons. However, during an ESD event across the domains, one would want a path for the high current to traverse. Without the antiparallel diodes in place, the voltage induced by the ESD event may result in the current following an unknown path that often leads to damage of the device. With the diodes in place the current can travel in either direction.

== See also ==
- Bidirectional LED
- Charlieplexing
