= MAX232 =

1987 integrated circuit

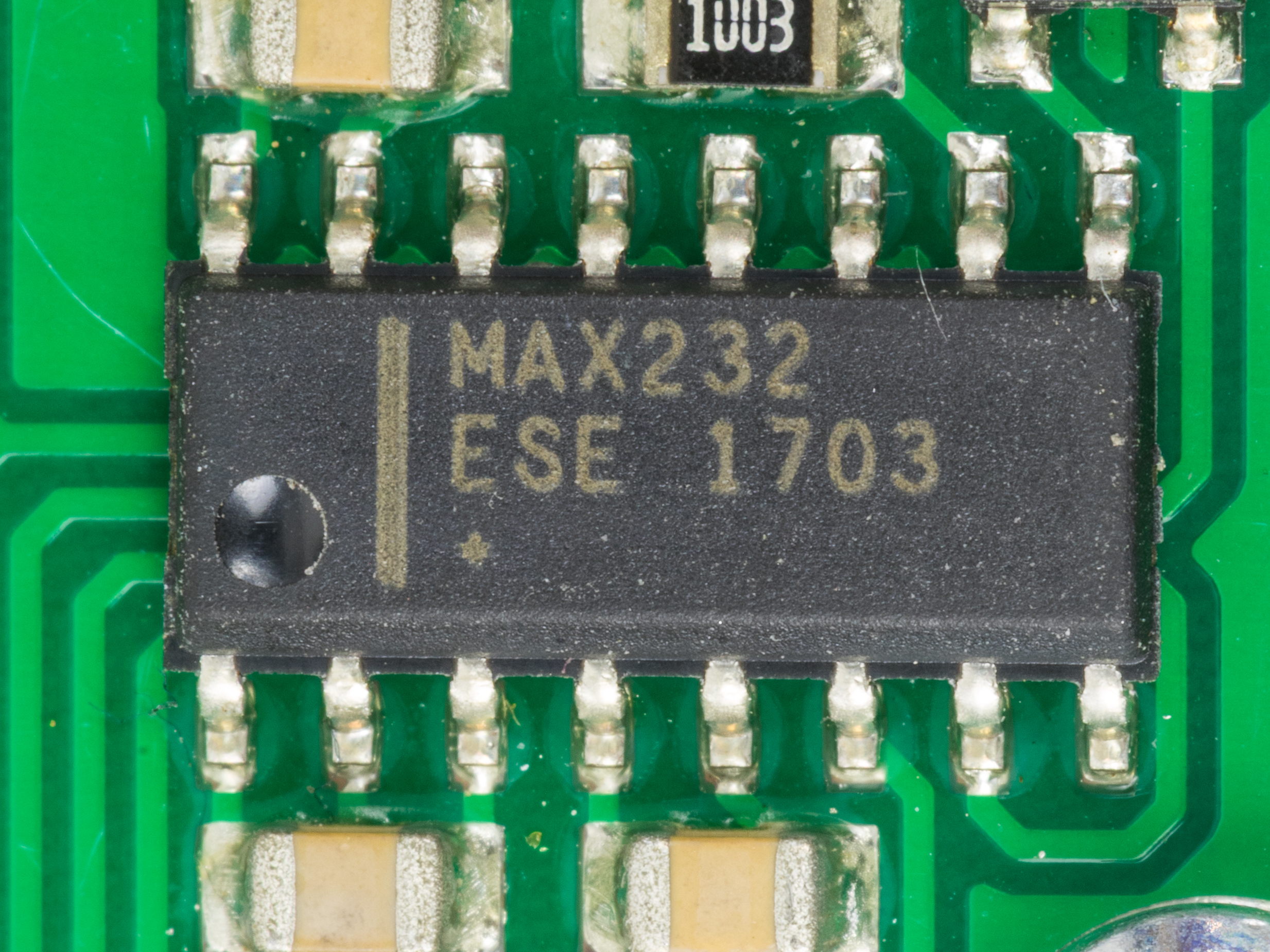
MAX232 chip in DIP-16 package

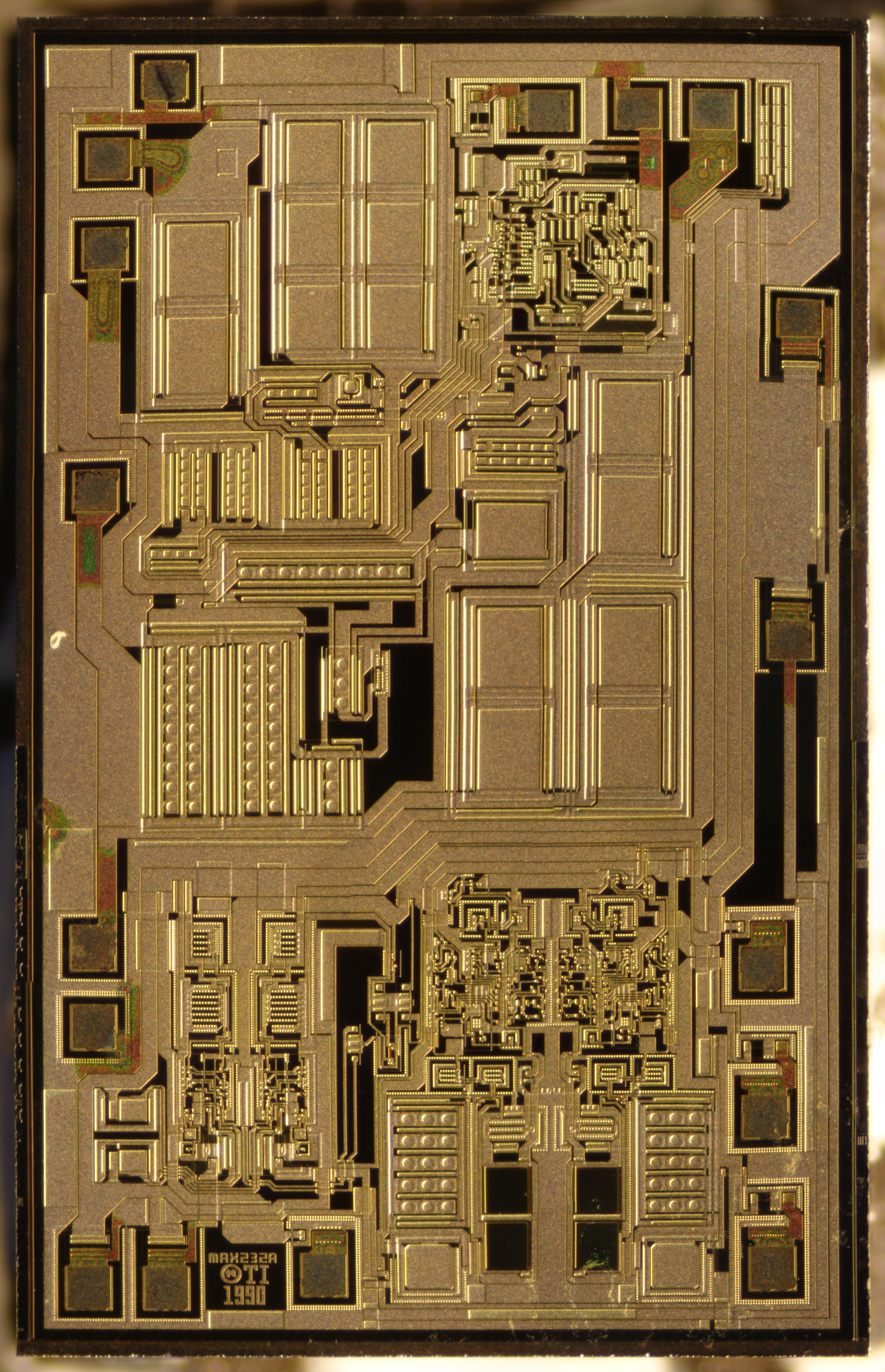
The die of a MAX232

MAX232 pinout: Red: power, Yellow: charge pump capacitors, Blue: outputs, Green: inputs, Pins 9–12: TTL/CMOS I/O voltages

The MAX232 is an integrated circuit by Maxim Integrated Products, now a subsidiary of Analog Devices, that converts signals from a TIA-232 (RS-232) serial port to signals suitable for use in TTL-compatible digital logic circuits. The MAX232 is a dual transmitter / dual receiver that typically is used to convert the RX, TX, CTS, RTS signals.

The drivers provide TIA-232 voltage level outputs (about ±7.5 volts) from a single 5-volt supply by on-chip charge pumps and external capacitors. This makes it useful for implementing TIA-232 in devices that otherwise do not need any other voltages. The receivers translate the TIA-232 input voltages (up to ±25 volts, though MAX232 supports up to ±30 volts) down to standard 5 volt TTL levels. These receivers have a typical threshold of 1.3 volts and a typical hysteresis of 0.5 volts.

The MAX232 replaced an older pair of chips MC1488 and MC1489 that performed similar RS-232 translation. The MC1488 quad transmitter chip required 12 volt and −12 volt power, and MC1489 quad receiver chip required 5 volt power. The main disadvantages of this older solution was the ±12 volt power requirement, only supported 5 volt digital logic, and two chips instead of one.

== History ==
The MAX232 was proposed by Charlie Allen and designed by Dave Bingham. Maxim Integrated Products announced the MAX232 no later than 1986.

== Versions ==
The later MAX232A is backward compatible with the original MAX232 but may operate at higher baud rates and can use smaller external capacitors – 0.1 μF in place of the 1.0 μF capacitors used with the original device. The newer MAX3232 and MAX3232E are also backwards compatible, but operates at a broader voltage range, from 3 to 5.5 V.

Pin-to-pin compatible versions from other manufacturers are ICL232, SP232, ST232, ADM232 and HIN232. Texas Instruments makes compatible chips, using MAX232 as the part number.

== Voltage levels ==
The MAX232 translates a TTL logic 0 input to between +3 and +15 V, and changes TTL logic 1 input to between −3 and −15 V, and vice versa for converting from TIA-232 to TTL. (The TIA-232 uses opposite voltages for data and control lines, see RS-232 voltage levels.)

TIA-232 line type and logic level	TIA-232 voltage	TTL voltage to/from MAX232
Data transmission (Rx/Tx) logic 0	+3 V to +15 V	0 V
Data transmission (Rx/Tx) logic 1	−3 V to −15 V	5 V
Control signals (RTS/CTS/DTR/DSR) logic 0	−3 V to −15 V	5 V
Control signals (RTS/CTS/DTR/DSR) logic 1	+3 V to +15 V	0 V

== Applications ==
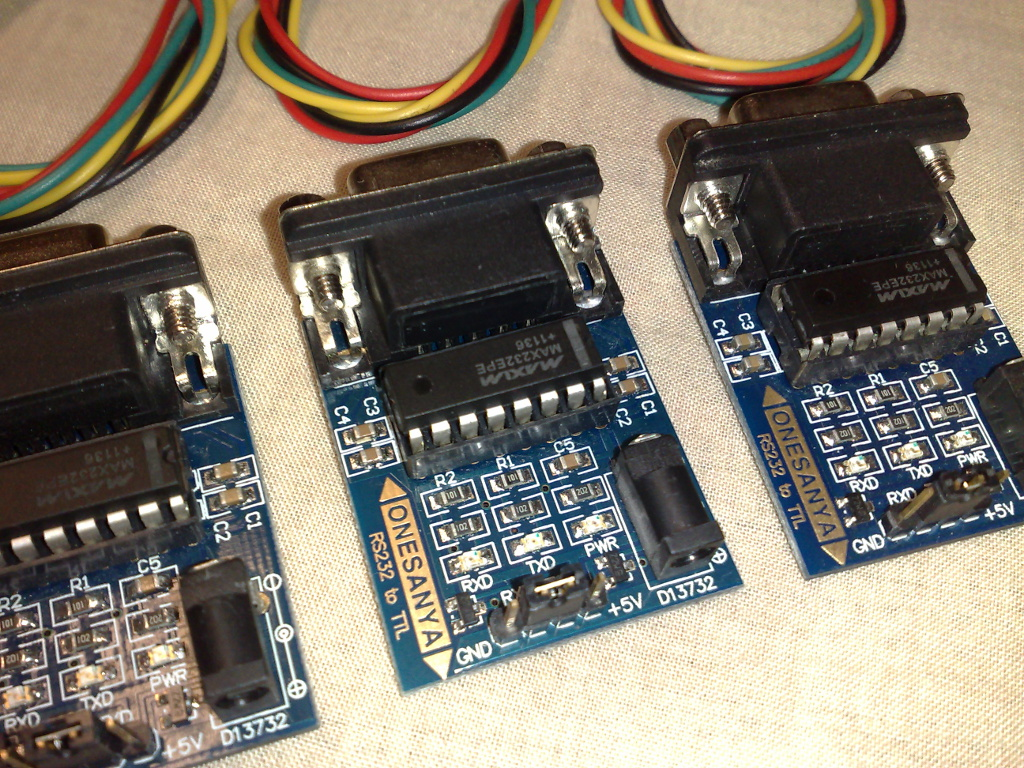
TIA-232 to TTL converters that use MAX232

The MAX232(A) has two receivers that convert from RS-232 to TTL voltage levels, and two drivers that convert from TTL logic to RS-232 voltage levels. As a result, only two out of all RS-232 signals can be converted in each direction. Typically, the first driver/receiver pair of the MAX232 is used for TX and RX signals, and the second one for CTS and RTS signals.

There are not enough drivers/receivers in the MAX232 to also connect the DTR, DSR, and DCD signals. Usually, these signals can be omitted when, for example, communicating with a PC's serial interface, or when special cables render them unnecessary. If the DTE requires these signals, a second MAX232 or some other IC from the MAX232 family can be used.

== Derivatives ==
The MAX232 family was subsequently extended by Maxim to versions with four transmitters (the MAX234) and a version with four receivers and four transmitters (the MAX248), as well as several other combinations of receivers and transmitters. A notable addition is the MAX316x which is able to be electrically reconfigured between differential 5 V (RS-422 and RS-485) and single-ended RS-232 albeit at reduced voltage.
