= AMS-Osram =

Austrian semiconductor manufacturer

ams OSRAM AG
- Type: Public
- Traded as: SIX: AMS
- ISIN: AT0000A3EPA4
- Industry: Semiconductors
- Founded: 1981; 45 years ago (as joint venture between AMI Semiconductor and voestalpine AG)
- Headquarters: Premstätten, Styria, Austria
- Key people: Aldo Kamper (CEO); Rainer Irle (CFO); Margarete Haase (SB Chairwoman)
- Revenue: ▼€3.590 billion (2023)
- Operating income: ▼€−1.43 billion (2023)
- Net income: ▼€−1.61 billion (2023)
- Total assets: ▼€7.401 billion (2023)
- Total equity: ▼€1.905 billion (2023)
- Number of employees: 20,378 (end 2023)
- Website: ams-osram.com

ams OSRAM AG is an Austrian semiconductor manufacturer headquartered in Premstätten, Austria with a co-headquarters in Munich, Germany. The company develops and produces intelligent sensors and emitter components.

In 2020 ams AG acquired the German lighting, LED, and opto-semiconductor manufacturer OSRAM. Since then, the company operates under the name ams OSRAM.

The ams OSRAM portfolio includes light emitters, sensors and CMOS ICs with embedded software solutions as well as lighting systems and specialty lamps for automotive, industrial and entertainment applications.The company mainly address the automotive, industrial and medical markets, as well as selected fields of consumer electronics.

== Business segments ==
ams OSRAM's activities, focused on light and sensor solutions, are organized into two main business segments, Semiconductors, with the business units Opto Semiconductors (OS) and CMOS Sensors & ASICs (CSA), and Lamps & Systems (L&S) with Automotive and Specialty Lamps.

=== Semiconductors ===
The Semiconductors segment covers semiconductor-based products and solutions, such as LEDs, lasers, sensors, and CMOS ICs with embedded software. It mainly serves OEMs and distributors in the automotive, industrial, medical, and consumer electronics sectors.

The products of the business unit "Opto Semiconductors" enable various applications including:

- Dynamic Automotive Lighting
- LiDAR lasers
- LED cabin and ambient lights
- Horticultural illumination
- Industrial and Outdoor lighting

The product range of the business unit "CMOS Sensors & ASICs" is used for applications such as:

- In-Cabin sensing
- 3D sensing
- Medical imaging, e.g. photon counting for X-ray imaging
- Specialized solutions for portable devices such as mobile phones and tablets (e.g. display management with light sensing or camera enhancements)

=== Lamps & Systems ===
The business segment Lamps & Systems comprises the Group’s business related to automotive and specialty lamps, with a focus on the automotive and industrial market. The L&S segment of ams OSRAM serves both original equipment manufacturers (OEMs) and customers in the aftermarket channel (e.g. retailers), as well as distributors that sell on to these customer groups.

The product range of the L&S business unit mainly covers

- Traditional halogen and xenon lamps
- Signal lamps for vehicles
- LED-based lamps and modules
- Retrofit lighting systems

== History ==
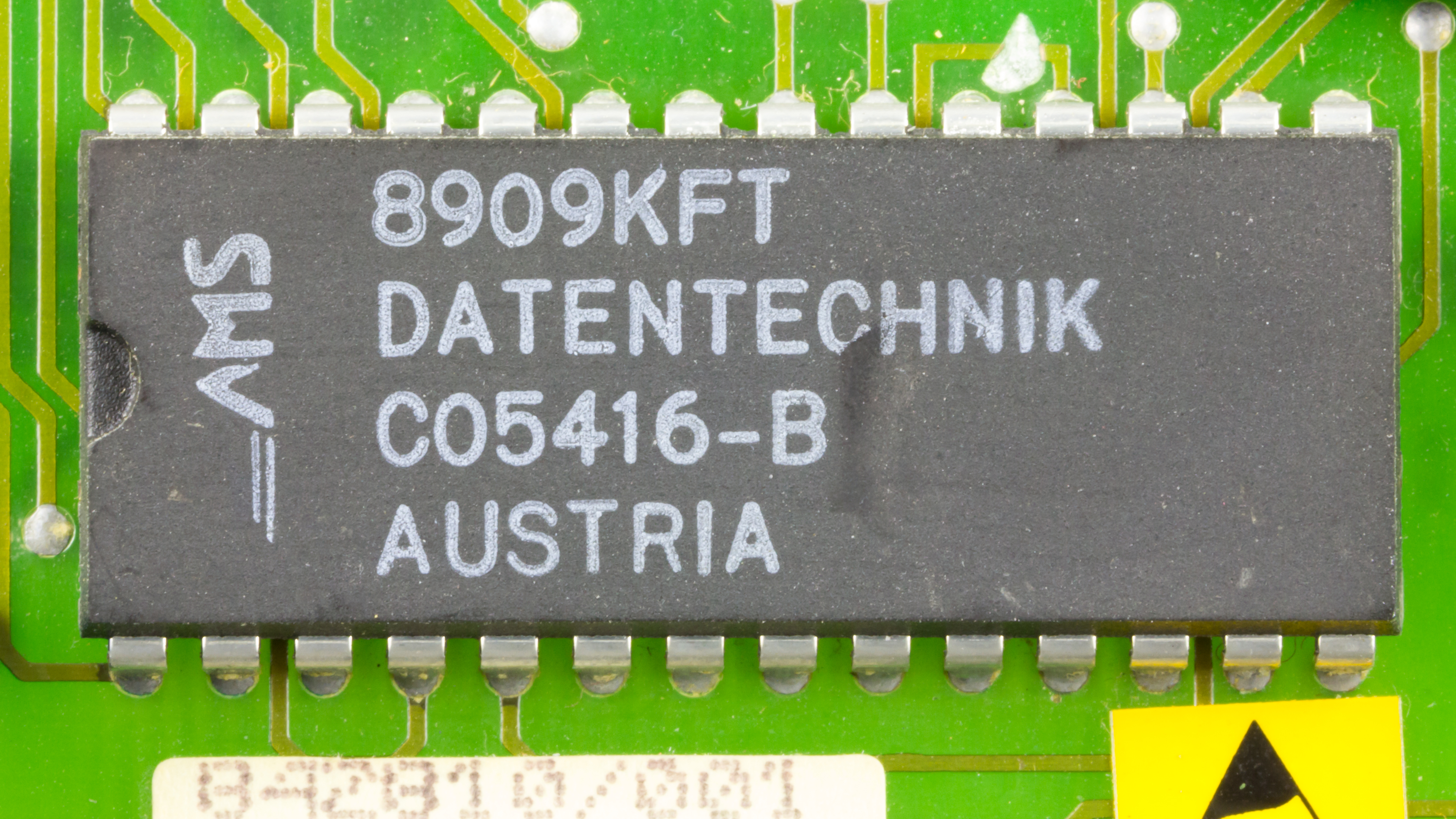
AMS IC on DataOverVoice (telecommunications) module

=== 1978–2000 ===
Voestalpine AG decides to expand its product and services range during the late 1970s and chooses the semiconductor industry. Due to voestalpine looking for a joint venture partner the first cooperation with American Microsystems, Inc. (AMI), later AMI Semiconductor, now part of onsemi) was formed.

In 1981, this joint venture resulted in the American Micro Systems Incorporated-Austria GmbH (AMI-A). AMI owned 51% and voestalpine AG 49%. The Schloss Premstätten in Unterpremstätten (Styria, Austria) was chosen as headquarters.

In 1983, the Austrian chancellor Fred Sinowatz officially opened the 100 mm wafer factory which started its production with 300 employees.

1987 was the year when voestalpine AG took over full ownership. In September of the same year the name was changed from AMI-A to AMS (Austria Mikro Systeme International GmbH). Furthermore, there were new sales branches established in California and Germany.

In 1991, ams became one of the 25 fastest growing businesses in Europe. ams was chosen to be the "top Fab of 1992".

In June 1993, ams was the first semiconductor company in Europe to go public, at the Vienna stock exchange.

ams opened the first sales office in Asia in 1996, the company was also accredited according to the ISO 14001:1996 and EMAS. In 1997, AMS achieved first successes in the area of deep sub-micron technologies.

NASA's "Deep Space 2" mission in 1998 took off with 2 chips developed from ams and the aircraft manufacturer Boeing. These chips were designed to manage the power supply of the whole space probe. In the same year the company was accredited according to the American and German automotive industry, QS 9000 and VDA 6.1 respectively.

Former logotype

In 2000, ams set the foundation for the new 200 mm wafer factory. With the support of its new private equity shareholder Permira, ams left the Vienna stock exchange the same year. This resulted in a further name change to austriamicrosystems AG.

=== 2001–2010 ===
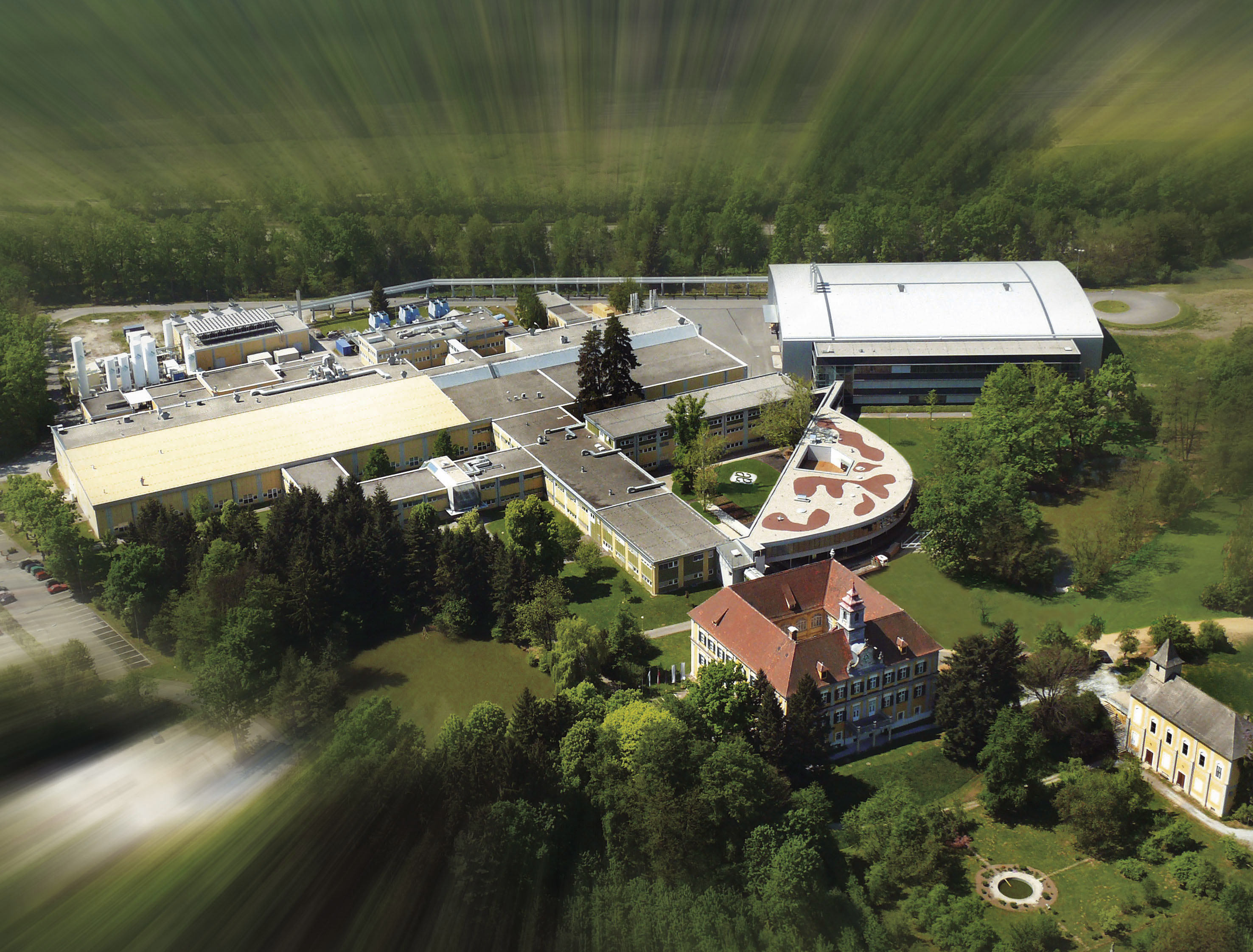
Headquarters in 2007.

The new 200 mm production line starts its trial run. At the same time a license agreement has been reached between austriamicrosystems AG and TSMC (Taiwan Semiconductor Manufacturing Company Ltd.), the largest global IC foundry. After the successful trial run the new 200 mm wafer factory goes ahead with the mass production in 2002. New sales offices in Singapore were opened in the same year, furthermore an expansion of locations in Hong Kong, Japan and the USA was carried out.

Silicon Strategies listed austriamicrosystems as the only European company under the top ten 2003 foundries worldwide. austriamicrosystems AG decided to continue its policy of expansion with new sales offices in South Korea, China (Suzhou), Finland and Sweden. Additionally, a design center for multimedia playback applications was set up in Bangalore, India.

2004 was the year austriamicrosystems AG found its way back to the stock exchange. Since 17 May that year austriamicrosystems AG is listed on the Swiss Stock Exchange, short SIX, in Zürich.

In 2005, the standard products as well as the capacity of the 200 mm wafer factory were expanded to compensate for the shut down of the old 100 mm factory which played a main part in the success of austriamicrosystems AG.

In 2006, the year of the 25th anniversary, a new test centre in the Philippines and a new design centre in India were built. The 200 mm wafer factory was also expanded further.

In 2007, austriamicrosystems AG stepped into new business segments in the form of a partnership with the micro motor manufacturer New Scale Technologies. In the same year the new cafeteria & conference centre (CCC) was built by the architect DI Tinchon.

ams AG reduced emissions and plans in the mid term to produce CO_{2}-free. Nevertheless, austriamicrosystems AG reached revenues amounting to EUR 209.4m in 2010.

=== 2011–2018 ===
In 2011, austriamicrosystems acquired 100% of the shares in Texas Advanced Optoelectronic Solutions, Inc. (TAOS), for about US$320 million (about EUR 220m). TAOS was a specialist in the area of light sensor technologies. Following the acquisition, in May 2012, austriamicrosystems rebranded to "ams" to combine austriamicrosystems and the brand of TAOS. Additionally, ams AG acquired IDS Microchip AG in the same year.

In June 2014, ams acquired 100% of shares in AppliedSensor, a maker of solid-state chemical gas sensors. Also in June 2014, ams published a statement of a possible merger of equals with Dialog Semiconductor. Few weeks later the company announced, that the proposed merger had failed.

In July 2015, ams acquired the advanced CMOS sensor business from NXP, as well as CMOSIS, a supplier of area scan and miniature medical CMOS image sensors.

In June 2016, ams acquired CAmbridge CMOS Sensors Ltd. (CCMOSS), a company specialiced in micro hotplate structures for gas measurement and infrared applications. Also in 2016, ams acquired color and spectral sensing specialist MAZeT, optical packaging firm Heptagon and Incus Laboratories, active in active noise cancellation in headphones and earphones.

In March 2017, ams acquired 100% of the shares in Princeton Optronics, Inc., a provider of Vertical Cavity Surface Emitting Lasers (VCSELs), in an all-cash transaction. The same year, ams announced that it would be opening site under $200 million plan in Singapore. Also in 2017 ams was the first company in Austria to sponsor an athletic team for the Special Olympics World Winter Games that were held in Austria in March 2017. The company hosted the U.S. team athletes from 14 to 16 March before they returned to the venues to prepare for the competition.

=== 2019– ===
In March 2019, ams and Wise Road Capital, a global private equity firm focusing on the semiconductor industry and other emerging high-tech industries, create a joint venture to advance the development and sales of environmental, flow and pressure sensors for the global market. In April 2019, ams share value surged 20% after offering their 3D sensor technology, that was once exclusive to their largest client, Apple, to manufacturers of Android smartphones.

In 2019, ams made headlines with its acquisition of the German lighting manufacturer OSRAM. In the summer of 2019, the U.S. investment firms Bain & Company and Advent International planned to jointly acquire the financially troubled company. Their offer was €35 per share, conditional on purchasing 70% of the shares for the takeover to proceed. In September 2019, ams AG also submitted an acquisition offer, proposing €38.50 per share and lowering the acceptance threshold to 62.5%. After initial concerns and resistance from the labor union, the OSRAM managing board decided to recommend ams AG's offer to its shareholders. However, the offer failed to meet the required acceptance threshold.

Shortly thereafter, ams made another attempt to acquire OSRAM. This time, the offer was €41 per share, with the acceptance threshold again lowered to 55%. On 6 December 2019, ams AG announced that 55% of the shares had been tendered by the deadline, and the acquisition was successful. The final acceptance rate at the end of the acceptance period was 59.9%. On 6 July 2020, the European Union approved the acquisition without conditions, raising no competition concerns.

In 2020, ams AG acquired a majority stake in OSRAM Licht AG, holding approximately 71% of the shares. In 2021, the integration of the two companies was finalized. Subsequently, ams OSRAM began operating under the joint brand name.

== Shareholder structure ==
The share capital of ams OSRAM amounts to EUR 998,443,940 and is divided into 99,844,394 no-par value bearer shares, each representing a notional value of EUR 10.00 of the company's share capital. As of 31 December 2024, ams OSRAM held 919,602 treasury shares, corresponding to approximately 0.92% of the total share capital.

The ams OSRAM stock has been listed on the main segment of the SIX Swiss Exchange since 17 May 2004 (Security Number: 24924656; ISIN: AT0000A3EPA4). Shares of ams OSRAM are also traded on the Vienna MTF of the Vienna Stock Exchange under this ISIN.
