= Diode matrix =

2-D grid of wires where data is represented by the presence or absence of diodes at nodes

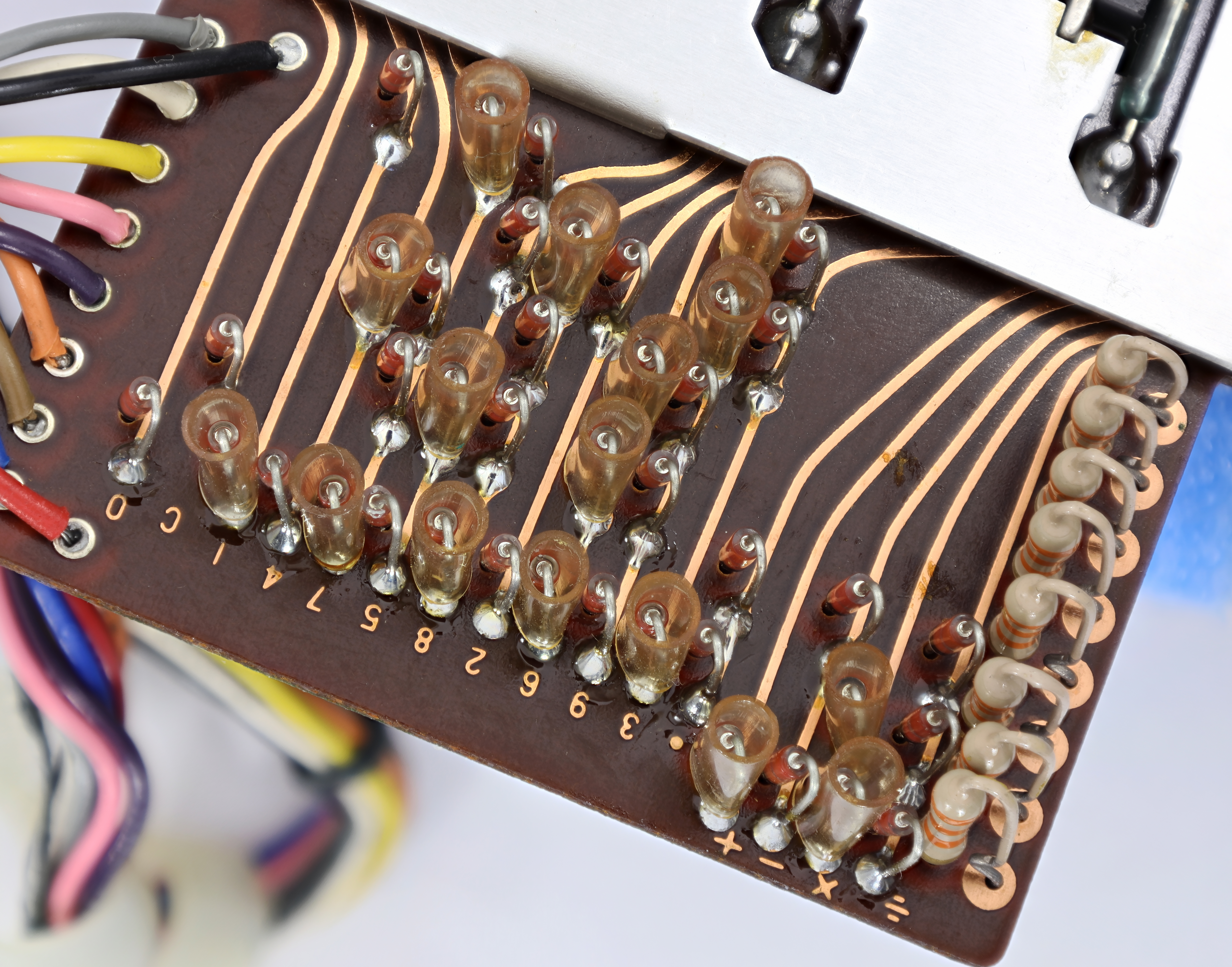
A diode matrix used in an early calculator to encode multiple key switches onto 10 signal lines. In this example, each row is connected to a key switch and energizes one of the visible copper traces. The diodes, small red cylindrical objects with wire leads, are soldered between the "row" traces visible here and the hidden "column" traces on the back side of this printed circuit board. A single key press can energize one or more wires to represent digits or functions of the calculator.

In digital electronics, a diode matrix is a two-dimensional grid of wires, with diodes connecting at selected intersections. A single row of the diode matrix is activated at any one instant. Current flows through each diode that connects to a column. These activated columns may be used as control signals for some connected system, or may represent computer data or instructions.

A diode matrix is one technique for implementing a read-only memory. It may be used as the control store or microprogram in many early computers. A logically equivalent transistor matrix is still used as the control store or microprogram or 'decode ROM' in many modern microprocessors.

== History ==
A diode matrix ROM was used in many computers in the 1960s and 70s, as well as electronic desk calculators and keyboard matrix circuits for computer terminals. A keyboard matrix circuit has a very similar grid of diodes, but is used differently.

The microsequencer of many early computers, perhaps starting with the Whirlwind I, simply activated each row of the diode matrix in sequence, and after the last row was activated, started over again with the first row.

The technique of microprogramming as first described by Maurice Wilkes in terms of a second diode matrix added to a diode matrix control store. Later computers used a variety of alternative implementations of the control store, but eventually returned to a diode matrix or transistor matrix. These alternatives included magnetic core schemes such as core rope memory, which held the program of the Apollo Guidance Computer, and the capacitor and transformer read-only storage (CCROS and TROS) used across the IBM System/360 family. A person would microprogram the control store on such early computers by manually attaching diodes to selected intersections of the word lines and bit lines. In schematic diagrams, the word lines are usually horizontal, and the bit lines are usually vertical.

The control store on some minicomputers was one or more programmable logic array chips. The "blank" PLA from the chip manufacturer came with a diode matrix or transistor matrix with a diode (or transistor) at every intersection. A person would microprogram the control store on these computers by destroying the unwanted connections at selected intersections.

Some modern microprocessors and ASICs use a diode matrix or transistor matrix control store. Typically a blank grid is designed with a diode (or transistor) at every intersection, and then a mask is prepared that leaves out the unwanted connections at selected intersections. When reverse engineering integrated circuits that include such a mask-programmed decode ROM, one of the key steps is to take photographs of that ROM with enough resolution to separate each intersection site and enough color depth to distinguish between the "connected" and "not connected" intersections.

Since the control store is in the critical path of computer execution, a fast control store is an important part of a fast computer. On heavily microcoded mainframes such as the IBM System/360 Model 50, the entire instruction set was carried out by microcode held in this fast read-only storage. For a while the control store was many times faster than program memory, allowing a long, complicated sequence of steps through the control store per instruction fetch, leading to what is now called complex instruction set computing. Later techniques for fast instruction cache sped that cache up to the point that the control store was only a few times faster than the instruction cache, leading to fewer and eventually only one step through the control store per instruction fetch in reduced instruction set computing.

== See also ==
- Diode logic
