= Intel MCS-51 =

Single chip microcontroller series by Intel

Intel 8051
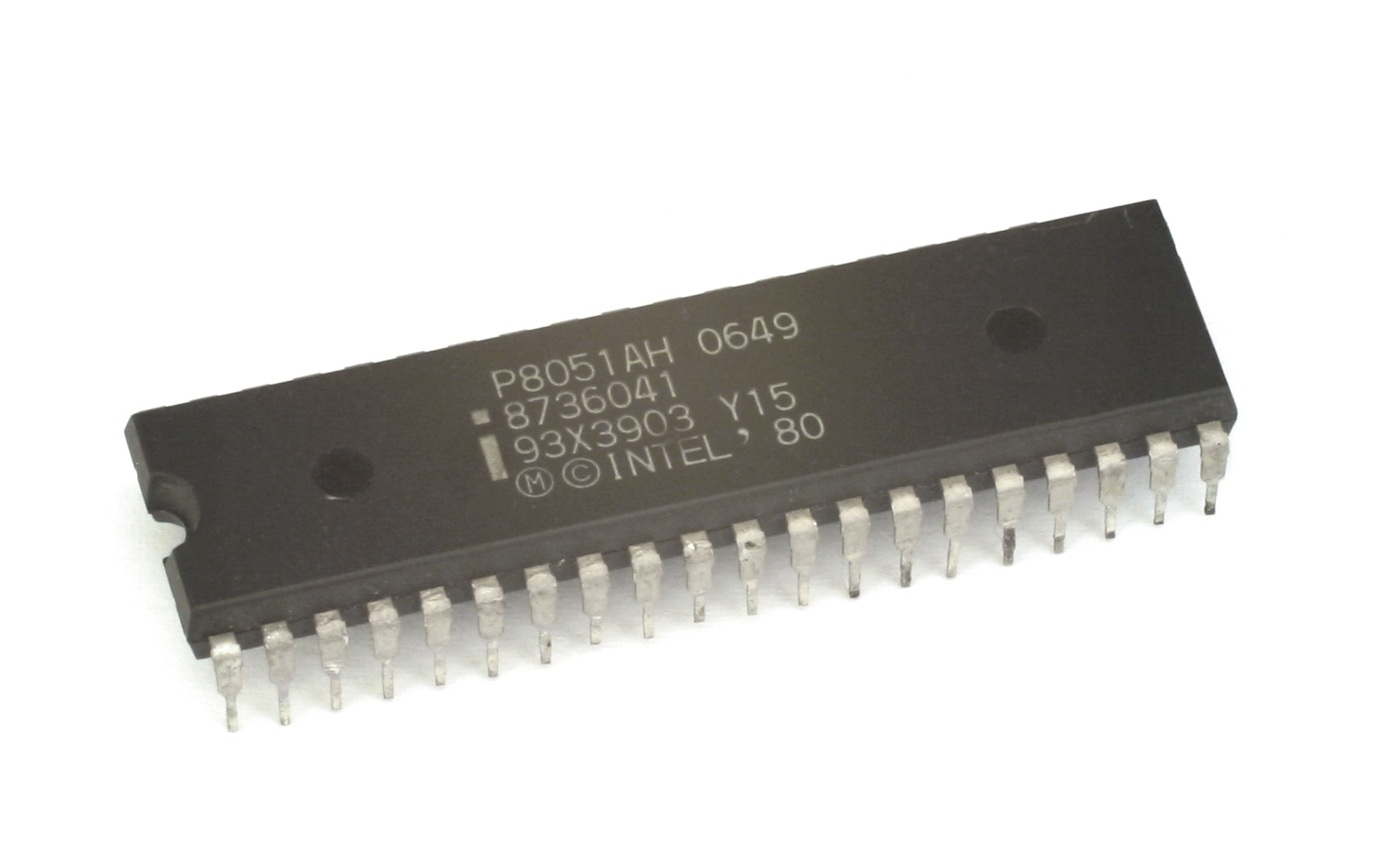
- Intel P8051 microcontroller

History
- Predecessor: Intel MCS-48
- Successor: Intel MCS-151

The Intel MCS-51 (commonly termed 8051) is a single-chip microcontroller (MCU) series developed by Intel in 1980 for use in embedded systems. Intel's original versions were popular in the 1980s and early 1990s, and enhanced binary compatible derivatives remain popular today. It is a complex instruction set computer with separate memory spaces for program instructions and data.

Intel's original MCS-51 family was developed using N-type metal–oxide–semiconductor (NMOS) technology, like its predecessor Intel MCS-48, but later versions, identified by a letter C in their name (e.g., 80C51) use complementary metal–oxide–semiconductor (CMOS) technology and consume less power than their NMOS predecessors. This made them more suitable for battery-powered devices.

The family was continued in 1996 with the enhanced 8-bit MCS-151 and the 8/16/32-bit MCS-251 family of binary compatible microcontrollers. While Intel no longer manufactures the MCS-51, MCS-151 and MCS-251 family, enhanced binary compatible derivatives made by numerous vendors remain popular today. Some derivatives integrate a digital signal processor (DSP) or a floating-point unit (coprocessor, FPU). Beyond these physical devices, several companies also offer MCS-51 derivatives as IP cores for use in field-programmable gate array (FPGA) or application-specific integrated circuit (ASIC) designs.

== Development ==
The architect of the Intel MCS-51 instruction set was John H. Wharton.

== Important features and applications ==
i8051 microarchitecture

The 8051 architecture provides many functions (central processing unit (CPU), random-access memory (RAM), read-only memory (ROM), input/output (I/O) ports, serial port, interrupt control, timers) in one package:

- 8-bit arithmetic logic unit (ALU) and accumulator, 8-bit registers (one 16-bit register with special move instructions), 8-bit data bus and 2 × 16-bit address buses, program counter, data pointer, and related 8/11/16-bit operations; hence it is mainly an 8-bit microcontroller
- Boolean processor with 17 instructions, 1-bit accumulator, 32 registers (4 × 8-bit, bit-addressable) and up to 144 special 1 bit-addressable RAM variables (18 × 8-bit)
- Multiply, divide and compare instructions
- Four fast switchable register banks with 8 registers each (memory-mapped)
- Fast interrupt with optional register bank switching
- Interrupts and threads with selectable priority
- 128 or 256 bytes of on-chip RAM (IRAM)
- Dual 16-bit address bus; it can access 2 × 2^{16} memory locations: 64 KB (65,536 locations) each of ROM (PMEM) and external RAM (XRAM), using two memory buses in a Harvard architecture.
- On-chip ROM (not included on 803x variants)
- Four (three full) 8-bit bidirectional input/output ports, bit-addressable
- UART (serial port)
- Two 16-bit counters/timers
- Power-saving mode (on some derivatives)

One feature of the 8051 core is the inclusion of a Boolean processing engine, which allows bit-level Boolean logic operations to be carried out directly and efficiently on select internal registers, ports and select RAM locations. Another feature is the inclusion of four bank-selectable working register sets, which greatly reduce the time required to perform the context switches to enter and leave interrupt service routines. With one instruction, the 8051 can switch register banks, avoiding the time-consuming task of transferring the critical registers to RAM.

=== Derivative features ===
As of 2013, new derivatives are still being developed by many major chipmakers, and major compiler suppliers such as IAR Systems, Keil and TASKING continuously release updates.

MCS-51-based microcontrollers typically include one or two UARTs, two or three timers, 128 or 256 bytes of internal data RAM (16 bytes of which are bit-addressable), up to 128 bytes of I/O, 512 bytes to 64 KB of internal program memory, and sometimes a quantity of extended data RAM (ERAM) located in the external data space. External RAM and ROM share the data and address buses. The original 8051 core ran at 12 clock cycles per machine cycle, with most instructions executing in one or two machine cycles. With a 12 MHz clock frequency, the 8051 could thus execute 1 million one-cycle instructions per second or 500,000 two-cycle instructions per second. Enhanced 8051 cores are now commonly used which run at six, four, two, or even one clock per machine cycle (denoted "1T") and have clock frequencies of up to 100 MHz, thus being capable of an even greater number of instructions per second. All Silicon Labs, some Dallas (now part of Maxim Integrated) and a few Atmel (now part of Microchip) devices have single-cycle cores.

8051 variants may include built-in reset timers with brown-out detection, on-chip oscillators, self-programmable flash ROM program memory, built-in external RAM, extra internal program storage, bootloader code in ROM, EEPROM non-volatile data storage, I^{2}C, SPI, and USB host interfaces, CAN or LIN bus, Zigbee or Bluetooth radio modules, PWM generators, analog comparators, analog-to-digital and digital-to-analog converters, RTCs, extra counters and timers, in-circuit debugging facilities, more interrupt sources, extra power-saving modes, more or fewer parallel ports etc. Intel manufactured a mask-programmed version, 8052AH-BASIC, with a BASIC interpreter in ROM, capable of running user programs loaded into RAM.

MCS-51-based microcontrollers have been adapted to extreme environments. Examples for high-temperature variants are the Tekmos TK8H51 family for −40 °C to +250 °C or the Honeywell HT83C51 for −55 °C to +225 °C (with operation for up to 1 year at +300 °C). Radiation-hardenend MCS-51 microcontrollers for use in spacecraft are available; e.g., from Cobham (formerly Aeroflex) as the UT69RH051 or from NIIET as the 1830VE32 (Russian: 1830ВЕ32).

In some engineering schools, the 8051 microcontroller is used in introductory microcontroller courses.

== Family naming conventions ==
Intel's first MCS-51 microcontroller was the 8051, with 4 KB ROM and 128 byte RAM. Variants starting with 87 have a user-programmable EPROM, sometimes UV-erasable. Variants with a C as the third character are some kind of CMOS. 8031 and 8032 are ROM-less versions, with 128 and 256 bytes of RAM. The last digit can indicate memory size, e.g., 8052 with 8 KB ROM, 87C54 16 KB EPROM, and 87C58 with 32 KB EPROM, all with 256-byte RAM.

== Memory architecture ==
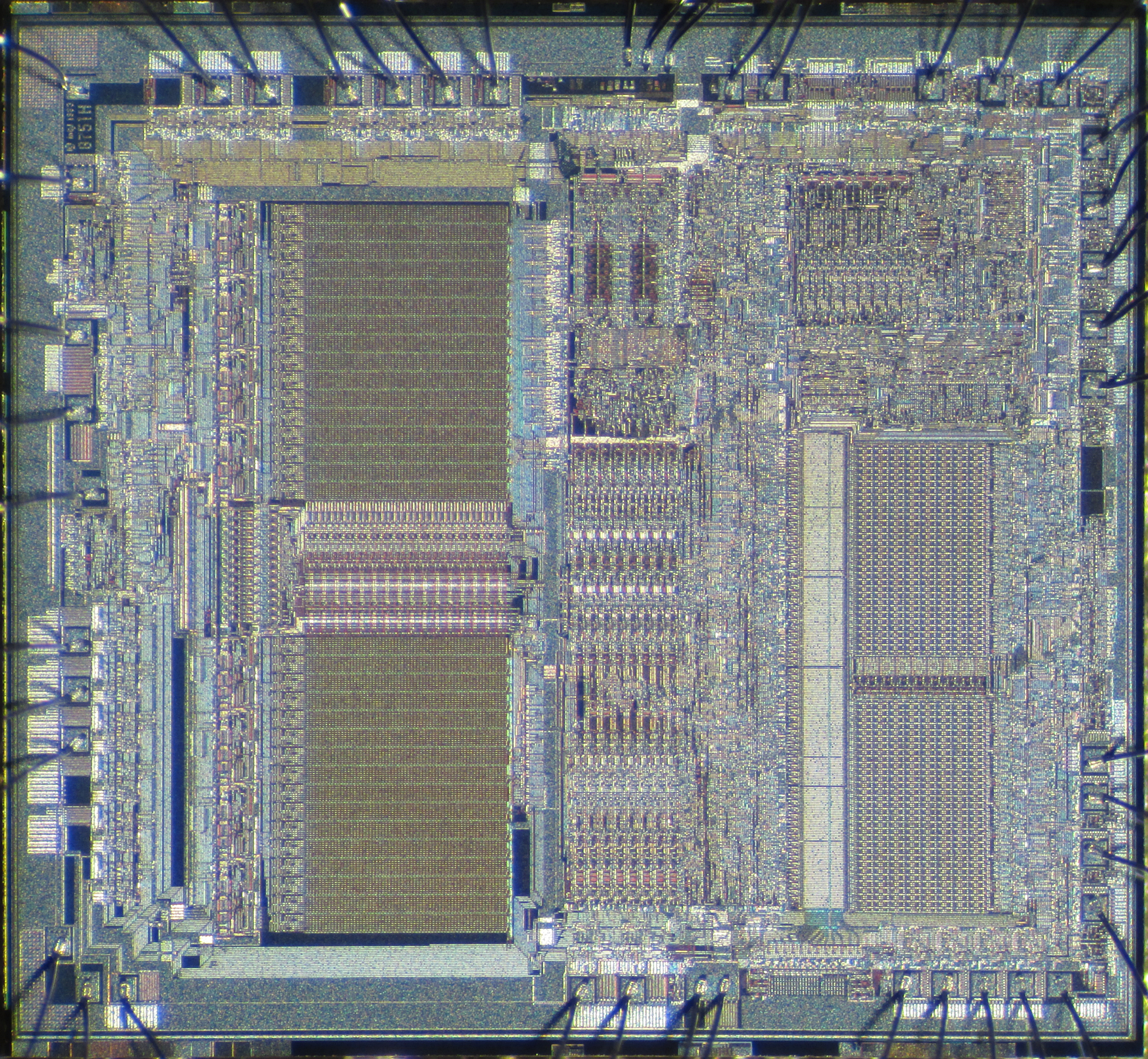
Die shot of 8751 with 4 KB EPROM and 128 bytes of RAM

The MCS-51 has four distinct types of memory: internal RAM, special function registers, program memory, and external data memory. To access these efficiently, some compilers utilize as many as 7 types of memory definitions: internal RAM, single-bit access to internal RAM, special function registers, single-bit access to selected (divisible by 8) special function registers, program RAM, external RAM accessed using a register indirect access, using one of the standard 8-bit registers, and register indirect external RAM access utilizing the 16-bit indirect access register.

The 8051's instruction set is designed as a Harvard architecture with segregated memory (data and instructions); it can only execute code fetched from program memory and has no instructions to write to program memory. However, the bus leaving the IC has a single address and data path, and strongly resembles a von Neumann architecture bus.

Most 8051 systems respect the instruction set and require customized features to download new executable programs, e.g., in flash memory.

=== Internal RAM ===
Internal RAM (IRAM) has an 8-bit address space, using addresses 0 through 0xFF. IRAM from 0x00 to 0x7F contains 128 directly addressable 1-byte registers, which can be accessed using an 8-bit absolute address that is part of the instruction. Alternatively, IRAM can be accessed indirectly: the address is loaded into R0 or R1, and the memory is accessed using the @R0 or @R1 syntax, or as stack memory through the stack pointer SP, with the PUSH/POP and *CALL/RET operations.

The original 8051 has only 128 bytes of IRAM. The 8052 added IRAM from 0x80 to 0xFF, which can only be accessed indirectly (e.g. for use as stack space). Most 8051 clones also have a full 256 bytes of IRAM.

Direct accesses to the IRAM addresses 0x80–0xFF are, instead, mapped onto the special function registers (SFR), where the accumulators A, B, carry bit C, and other special registers for control, status, etc., are located.

=== Special function registers ===
Special function registers (SFR) are located in the same address space as IRAM, at addresses 0x80 to 0xFF, and are accessed directly using the same instructions as for the lower half of IRAM. They cannot be accessed indirectly via @R0 or @R1 or by the stack pointer SP; indirect access to those addresses will access the second half of IRAM instead.

The special function registers (SFR) include the accumulators A (or ACC, at E0) and B (at F0) and program status word (or PSW, at D0), themselves, as well as the 16-bit data pointer DPTR (at 82, as DPL and 83 as DPH). In addition to these, a small core of other special function registers – including the interrupt enable IE at A8 and interrupt priority IP at B8; the I/O ports P0 (80), P1 (90), P2 (A0), P3 (B0); the serial I/O control SCON (98) and buffer SBUF (99); the CPU/power control register PCON (87); and the registers for timers 0 and 1 control (TCON at 88) and operation mode (TMOD at 89), the 16-bit timer 0 (TL0 at 8A, TH0 at 8C) and timer 1 (TL1 at 8B, TH1 at 8D) – are present on all versions of the 8051. Other addresses are version-dependent; in particular, the registers of timer 2 for the 8052, the control register T2CON (at C8), the 16-bit capture/latch (RCAP2L at CA, RCAP2H at CB) and timer 2 (TL2 at CC and TH2 at CD) are not included with the 8051.

=== Register windows ===
The 32 bytes in IRAM from 0x00 to 0x1F contain space for four 8-byte register windows, which the eight registers R0–R7 map to. The currently active window is determined by a two-bit address contained in the program status word.

=== Bit registers ===
The 16 bytes (128 bits) at IRAM locations 0x20–0x2F contain space for 128 1-bit registers, which are separately addressable as bit registers 00–7F.

The remaining bit registers, addressed as 80–FF, are mapped onto the 16 special function registers 80, 88, 90, 98, ..., F0 and F8 (those whose addresses are multiples of 8), and therefore include the bits comprising the accumulators A, B and program status word PSW. The register window address, being bits 3 and 4 of the PSW, is itself addressable as bit registers D3 and D4 respectively; while the carry bit C (or CY), at bit 7 of the PSW, is addressable as bit register D7.

=== Program memory ===
Program memory (PMEM, though less common in usage than IRAM and XRAM) is up to 64 KB of read-only memory, starting at address 0 in a separate address space. It may be on- or off-chip, depending on the particular model of chip being used. Program memory is read-only, though some variants of the 8051 use on-chip flash memory and provide a method of re-programming the memory in-system or in-application.

In addition to code, it is possible to store read-only data, such as lookup tables in program memory, retrieved by the MOVC A,@A+DPTR or MOVC A,@A+PC instructions. The address is computed as the sum of the 8-bit accumulator and a 16-bit register (PC or DPTR).

Special jump and call instructions (AJMP and ACALL) slightly reduce the size of code that accesses local (within the same 2 KB) program memory.

When code larger than 64 KB is required, a common system makes the code bank-switched, with general-purpose I/O selecting the upper address bits. Some 8051 compilers make provisions to automatically access paged code. In these systems, the interrupt vectors and paging table are placed in the first 32 KB of code and are always resident.

=== External data memory ===
External data memory (XRAM) is a third address space, also starting at address 0, and allowing 16 bits of address space. It can also be on- or off-chip; what makes it "external" is that it must be accessed using the MOVX (move external) instruction. Many variants of the 8051 include the standard 256 bytes of IRAM plus a few kilobytes of XRAM on the chip.

The first 256 bytes of XRAM may be accessed using the MOVX A,@R0, MOVX A,@R1, MOVX @R0,A, and MOVX @R1,A instructions. The full 64 KB may be accessed using MOVX A,@DPTR and MOVX @DPTR,A. The 16-bit address requires the programmer to load the 16-bit index register. For this reason, RAM accesses with 16-bit addresses are substantially slower.

Some CPUs permit the 8-bit indirect address to use any 8-bit general-purpose register.

To permit the use of this feature, some 8051-compatible microcontrollers with internal RAM larger than 256 bytes, or an inability to access external RAM, access internal RAM as if it were external, and have a special function register (e.g., PDATA) that permits them to set the upper address of the 256-byte page. This emulates the MCS8051 mode that can page the upper byte of a RAM address by setting the general-purpose I/O pins.

When RAM larger than 64 KB is required, a common system makes the RAM bank-switched, with general-purpose I/O selecting the upper address bits. Some 8051 compilers make provisions to automatically access paged data.

== Registers ==
The only register on an 8051 that is not memory-mapped is the 16-bit program counter (PC). This specifies the address of the next instruction to execute. Relative branch instructions supply an 8-bit signed offset, which is added to the PC.

Eight general-purpose registers R0–R7 may be accessed with instructions one byte shorter than others. They are mapped to IRAM between 0x00 and 0x1F. Only eight bytes of that range are used at any given time, determined by the two bank-select bits in the PSW.

The following is a partial list of the 8051's registers, which are memory-mapped into the special function register space:

Stack pointer, SP (0x81)
This is an 8-bit register used by subroutine call and return instructions. The stack grows upward; the SP is incremented before pushing and decremented after popping a value.
Data pointer, DP (0x82–83)
This is a 16-bit register that is used for accessing PMEM and XRAM.
Program status word, PSW (0xD0)
This contains important status flags, by bit number:
1. Parity, P. Gives the parity (XOR of the bits) of the accumulator, A.
2. User defined, UD. May be read and written by software; not otherwise affected by hardware.
3. Overflow flag, OV. Set when addition produces a signed overflow.
4. Register select 0, RS0. The low-order bit of the register bank. Set when banks at 0x08 or 0x18 are in use.
5. Register select 1, RS1. The high-order bit of the register bank. Set when banks at 0x10 or 0x18 are in use.
6. Flag 0, F0. May be read and written by software; not otherwise affected by hardware.
7. Auxiliary carry, AC. Set when addition produces a carry from bit 3 to bit 4.
8. Carry bit, C. Often used as the general register for bit computations, or the "Boolean accumulator".
Accumulator, A (0xE0)
This register is used by most instructions.
B register (0xF0)
This is used as an extension to the accumulator for multiply and divide instructions.

256 single bits are directly addressable. These are the 16 IRAM locations from 0x20–0x2F, and the 16 special function registers 0x80, 0x88, 0x90, ..., 0xF8. Any bit of these bytes may be directly accessed by a variety of logical operations and conditional branches.

Note that the PSW does not contain the common negative (N), or zero (Z) flags. For the former, the most significant bit of the accumulator can be addressed directly, as it is a bit-addressable SFR. For the latter, there are explicit instructions to jump on whether or not the accumulator is zero. There is also a two-operand compare and jump operation.

The parity (P) bit is often used to implement serial modes that include parity. To support this, the standard MCS51 UARTs could send 9 bits.

== Microarchitecture ==
The microarchitecture of the Intel MCS8051 is proprietary, but published features suggest how it works. It is a multi-cycle processor. The MCS8051 used 12 clock cycles for most instructions. Many instructions utilize an accumulator. In contrast, most compatible computers execute instructions in one to three cycles, except for the multiply and divide instructions. The much higher speed is a major reason why these have replaced the MCS8051 in most applications.

Each interrupt has four priorities. Within each priority, the interrupts of devices are in a fixed priority.

== Instruction set ==
Instructions are all 1 to 3 bytes long, consisting of an initial opcode byte, followed by up to 2 bytes of operands.

1/4 of the opcode bytes, x0–x3, are used for irregular opcodes.

3/4 of the opcode bytes, x4–xF, are assigned to 16 basic ALU instructions with 12 possible operands. The least significant nibble of the opcode selects the primary operand as follows:

- x8–xF: Register direct, R0–R7.
- x6–x7: Register indirect, @R0 or @R1.
- x5: Memory direct address, a following byte specifies an IRAM or SFR location.
- x4: Immediate #data, a following byte specifies an 8-bit constant. When the operand is a destination (INC operand, DEC operand) or the operation already includes an immediate source (MOV operand,#data, CJNE operand,#data,offset), this instead specifies that the accumulator is used.

The three bitwise operations ANL. ORL and XRL, which normally operate on the accumulator, also support two memory-destination modes:

- x3: opL address,#data
- x2: opL address,A

The most significant nibble specifies the operation as follows. Not all support all addressing modes; the immediate mode, in particular, is unavailable when the primary operand is written to, so is only applicable to six operations, and encodes an accumulator destination in four more. Instruction mnemonics use destination, source operand order.

0y: INC operand
Increment the specified operand. Immediate mode (opcode 0x04) specifies the accumulator, INC A.
1y: DEC operand
Decrement the specified operand. Immediate mode (opcode 0x14) specifies the accumulator, DEC A.
2y: ADD A,operand
Add the operand to the accumulator, A. Opcode 0x23 (RL A, "rotate left" but actually a shift left) may be thought of as ADD A,A.
3y: ADDC A,operand
Add the operand, plus the C bit, to the accumulator. Opcode 0x33 (RLC A, rotate left through carry) may be thought of as ADDC A,A.
4y: ORL A,operand
Logical OR the operand into the accumulator. Two memory-destination forms of this operation, ORL address,#data and ORL address,A, are specified by opcodes 0x43 and 0x42.
5y: ANL A,operand
Logical AND the operand into the accumulator. Two memory-destination forms of this operation, ANL address,#data and ANL address,A, are specified by opcodes 0x53 and 0x52.
6y: XRL A,operand
Logical exclusive-OR the operand into the accumulator. Two memory-destination forms of this operation, XRL address,#data and XRL address,A, are specified by opcodes 0x63 and 0x62.
7y: MOV operand,#data
Move immediate to the operand. Immediate mode (opcode 0x74) specifies the accumulator, MOV A,#data.
8y: MOV address,operand
Move value to an IRAM or SFR register. Memory direct mode (opcode 0x85) moves directly between two IRAM or SFR registers, MOV address,address. Immediate mode (opcode 0x84) is not used for this operation, as it duplicates opcode 0x75.
9y: SUBB A,operand
Subtract the operand and the carry flag from the accumulator. This operation borrows and there is no subtract without borrow.
Ay: MOV operand,address
Move value from an IRAM or SFR register. Memory direct mode (opcode 0xA5) is not used, as it duplicates 0x85. Immediate/accumulator mode (opcode 0xA4) is not used, as it duplicates 0xE5.
By: CJNE operand,#data,offset
Compare operand to the immediate #data, and jump to PC + offset if not equal. Because this instruction already has the maximum possible two bytes of operand, immediate and memory direct modes (opcodes 0xB4 and 0xB5) omit the immediate #data and instead compare the operand against the accumulator, CJNE A,#data,offset amd CJNE A,address,offset. Note that there is no compare and jump if equal instruction, CJE.
Cy: XCH A,operand
Exchange the accumulator and the operand. Immediate/accumulator mode (opcode 0xC4) is not used for this operation, as XCH A,A would have no effect.
Dy: DJNZ operand,offset
Decrement the operand, and jump to PC + offset if the result is non-zero. Immediate mode (opcode 0xD4), and register indirect mode (0xD6, 0xD7) are not used.
Ey: MOV A,operand
Move operand to the accumulator. Immediate mode is not used for this operation (opcode 0xE4), as it duplicates opcode 0x74.
Fy: MOV operand,A
Move accumulator to the operand. Immediate/accumulator mode (opcode 0xF4) is not used, as MOV A,A would have no effect.

Only the ADD, ADDC, and SUBB instructions set PSW flags. The INC, DEC, and logical instructions do not. The CJNE instruction modifies the C bit only, to the borrow that results from operand1 − operand2.

The irregular instructions have more limited addressing modes, and are encoded in the range x0–x3, plus a few opcodes in the x4–x7 range not used by the regular instructions.

8051/8052 irregular instructions
Opcode	x0	x1	x2	x3	x4
0y	NOP	AJMP addr11, ACALL addr11	LJMP addr16	RR A (rotate right)	INC A
1y	JBC bit,offset (jump if bit set with clear)	AJMP addr11, ACALL addr11	LCALL addr16	RRC A (rotate right through carry)	DEC A
2y	JB bit,offset (jump if bit set)	AJMP addr11, ACALL addr11	RET	RL A (rotate left)	ADD A,#data
3y	JNB bit,offset (jump if bit clear)	AJMP addr11, ACALL addr11	RETI	RLC A (rotate left through carry)	ADDC A,#data
4y	JC offset (jump if carry set)	AJMP addr11, ACALL addr11	ORL address,A	ORL address,#data	ORL A,#data
5y	JNC offset (jump if carry clear)	AJMP addr11, ACALL addr11	ANL address,A	ANL address,#data	ANL A,#data
6y	JZ offset (jump if zero)	AJMP addr11, ACALL addr11	XRL address,A	XRL address,#data	XRL A,#data
7y	JNZ offset (jump if non-zero)	AJMP addr11, ACALL addr11	ORL C,bit	JMP @A+DPTR	MOV A,#data
8y	SJMP offset (short jump)	AJMP addr11, ACALL addr11	ANL C,bit	MOVC A,@A+PC	DIV AB
9y	MOV DPTR,#data16	AJMP addr11, ACALL addr11	MOV bit,C	MOVC A,@A+DPTR	SUBB A,#data
Ay	ORL C,/bit	AJMP addr11, ACALL addr11	MOV C,bit	INC DPTR	MUL AB
By	ANL C,/bit	AJMP addr11, ACALL addr11	CPL bit	CPL C	CJNE A,#data,offset
Cy	PUSH address	AJMP addr11, ACALL addr11	CLR bit	CLR C	SWAP A
Dy	POP address	AJMP addr11, ACALL addr11	SETB bit	SETB C	DA A (decimal adjust)
Ey	MOVX A,@DPTR	AJMP addr11, ACALL addr11	MOVX A,@R0	MOVX A,@R1	CLR A
Fy	MOVX @DPTR,A	AJMP addr11, ACALL addr11	MOVX @R0,A	MOVX @R1,A	CPL A

Additional irregular instructions:

A5
ESC Unused by the 8051, but used for extended opcodes by successors such as the § MCS-251.
D6–7
XCHD A,@R0–1 exchange low-order nibble of operands.

The SJMP (short jump) opcode takes a signed relative offset byte operand and transfers control there relative to the address of the following instruction. The AJMP/ACALL opcodes combine the three most significant bits of the opcode byte with the following byte to specify an 11-bit destination that is used to replace the low 11 bits of the PC register (the top 5 bits of the PC register remain intact, so this can only jump within a 2048-byte page). For larger distances, the LJMP and LCALL instructions allow a 16-bit destination.

One of the reasons for the 8051's popularity is its range of operations on single bits. Bits are always specified by absolute addresses; there is no register-indirect or indexed addressing. Instructions that operate on single bits are:

- SETB bit, CLR bit, CPL bit: Set, clear, or complement the specified bit
- JB bit,offset: Jump (to PC+offset) if bit set
- JNB bit,offset: Jump if bit clear
- JBC bit,offset: Jump if bit set, and clear bit
- MOV C,bit, MOV bit,C: Move the specified bit to the carry bit, or vice versa
- ORL C,bit, ORL C,/bit: Or the bit (or its complement) into the carry bit
- ANL C,bit, ANL C,/bit: And the bit (or its complement) into the carry bit

A bit operand is written in the form address.number. Because the carry flag is bit 7 of the bit-addressable program status word, the SETB C, CLR C and CPL C instructions are shorter equivalents to SETB PSW.7, CLR PSW.7 and CPL PSW.7.

== Programming ==
There are various high-level programming language compilers for the 8051. Several C compilers are available for the 8051, most of which allow the programmer to specify where each variable should be stored in its six types of memory, and provide access to 8051-specific hardware features such as the multiple register banks and bit manipulation instructions. There are many commercial C compilers. Small Device C Compiler (SDCC) is a popular open-source C compiler. Other high level languages such as C++, Forth, BASIC, Object Pascal, Pascal, PL/M and Modula-2 are available for the 8051, but they are less widely used than C and assembly.

Because IRAM, XRAM, and PMEM (read only) all have an address 0, C compilers for the 8051 architecture provide compiler-specific pragmas or other extensions to indicate where a particular piece of data should be stored (i.e., constants in PMEM or variables needing fast access in IRAM). Since data could be in one of three memory spaces, a mechanism is usually provided to allow determining to which memory a pointer refers, either by constraining the pointer type to include the memory space or by storing metadata with the pointer.

== Related processors ==
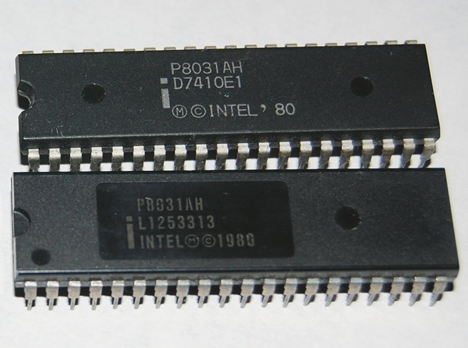
Intel 8031 microcontrollers

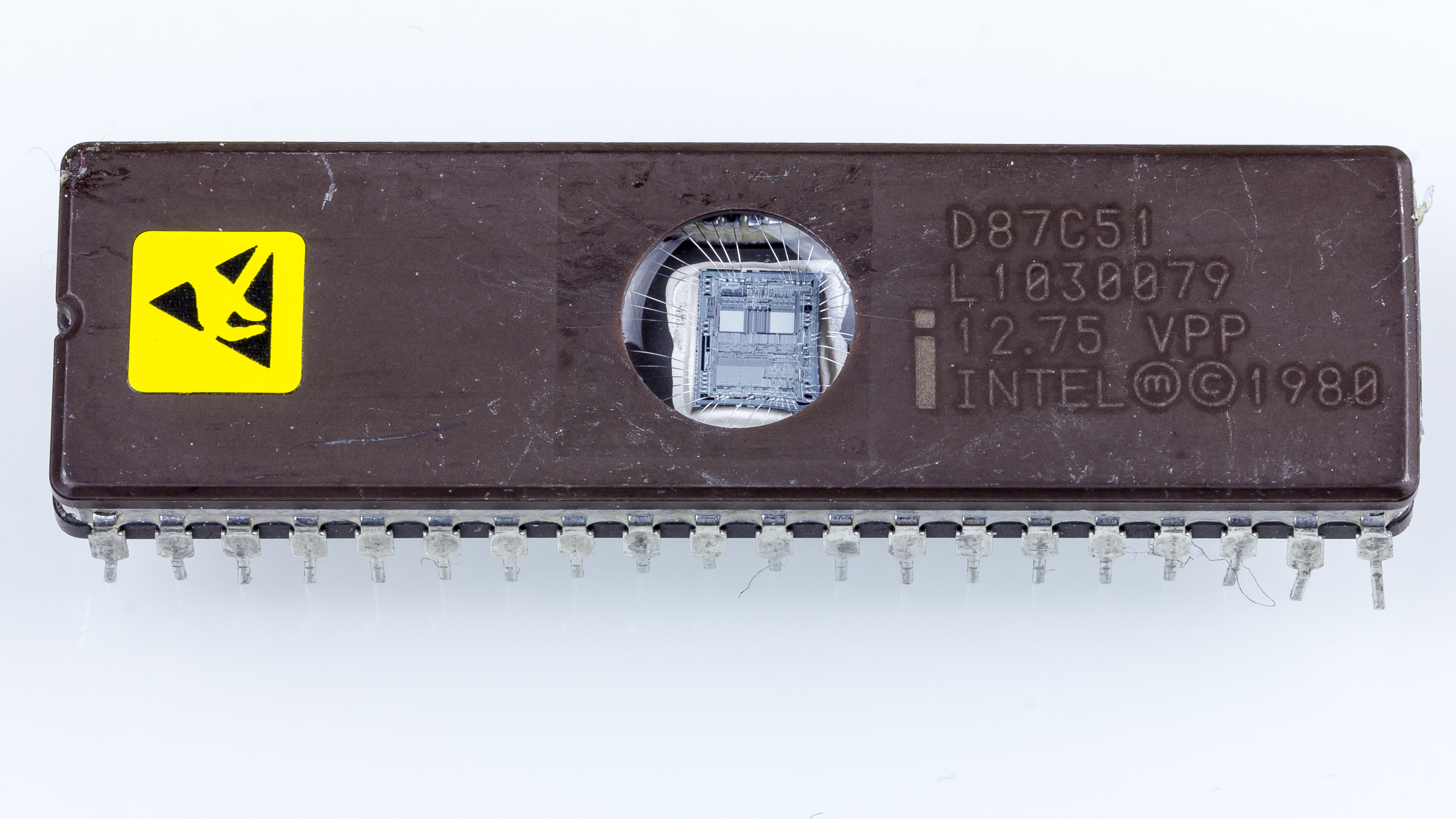
Intel D87C51 microcontroller

Intel discontinued its MCS-51 product line in March 2007; however, there are plenty of enhanced 8051 products or silicon intellectual property added regularly from other vendors.

The 8051's predecessor, the 8048, was used in the keyboard of the first IBM PC, where it converted keypresses into the serial data stream, which is sent to the main unit of the computer. An Intel 8049 served a similar role in the Sinclair QL. The 8048 and derivatives are still used today for basic model keyboards.

The 8031 was a reduced version of the original 8051 that had no internal program ROM. To use this chip, external ROM had to be added containing the program that the 8031 would fetch and execute. An 8051 chip could be sold as a ROM-less 8031, as the 8051's internal ROM is disabled by the normal state of the EA pin in an 8031-based design. A vendor might sell an 8051 as an 8031 for any number of reasons, such as faulty code in the 8051's ROM, or simply an oversupply of 8051s and undersupply of 8031s.

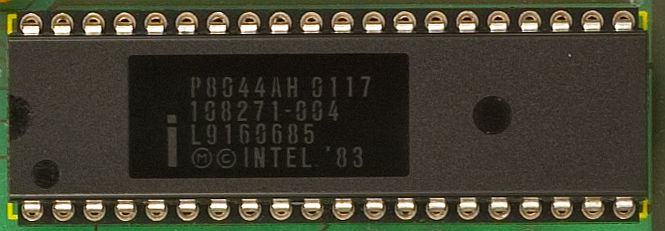
Intel P8044AH microcontroller

The 8044 (as well as the ROM-less 8344 and the 8744 with EPROM) added an SDLC controller to the 8051 core (especially for Bitbus applications).

The 8052 was an enhanced version of the original 8051 that featured 256 bytes of internal RAM instead of 128 bytes, 8 KB of ROM instead of 4 KB, and a third 16-bit timer. Most modern 8051-compatible microcontrollers include these features.

The 8032 had these same features as the 8052, except it lacked internal ROM program memory.

The 8751 was an 8051 with 4 KB EPROM instead of 4 KB ROM. They were identical except for the non-volatile memory type. This part was available in a ceramic package with a clear quartz window over the top of the die so UV light could be used to erase the EPROM. Related parts are: 8752 had 8 KB EPROM, 8754 had 16 KB EPROM, 8758 had 32 KB EPROM.

The 80C537 (ROM-less) and 80C517 (8 KB ROM) are CMOS versions, designed for the automotive industry. Enhancements mostly include new and enhanced peripherals. The 80C5x7 has fail-safe mechanisms, analog signal processing facilities, enhanced timer capabilities, and a 32-bit arithmetic peripheral. Other features include:

- 256-byte on-chip RAM
- 256 directly addressable bits
- External program and data memory expandable up to 64 KB
- 8-bit A/D converter with 12 multiplexed inputs
- Arithmetic peripheral can perform 16×16→32-bit multiplication, 32/16→16-bit division, 32-bit shift and 32-bit normalize operations
- Eight data pointers instead of one for indirect addressing of program and external data memory
- Extended watchdog facilities
- Nine I/O ports
- Two full-duplex serial interfaces with individual baud rate generators
- Four priority level interrupt systems, 14 interrupt vectors
- Three power-saving modes
Intel MCS-51 second sources

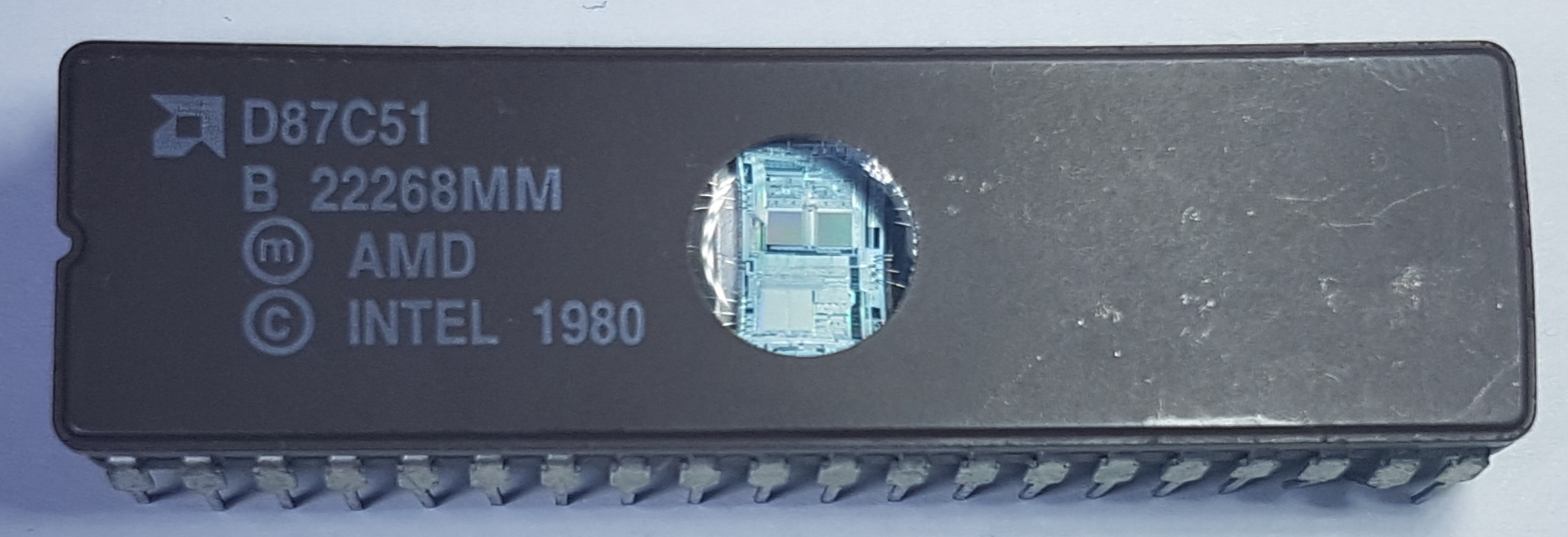
AMD D87C51

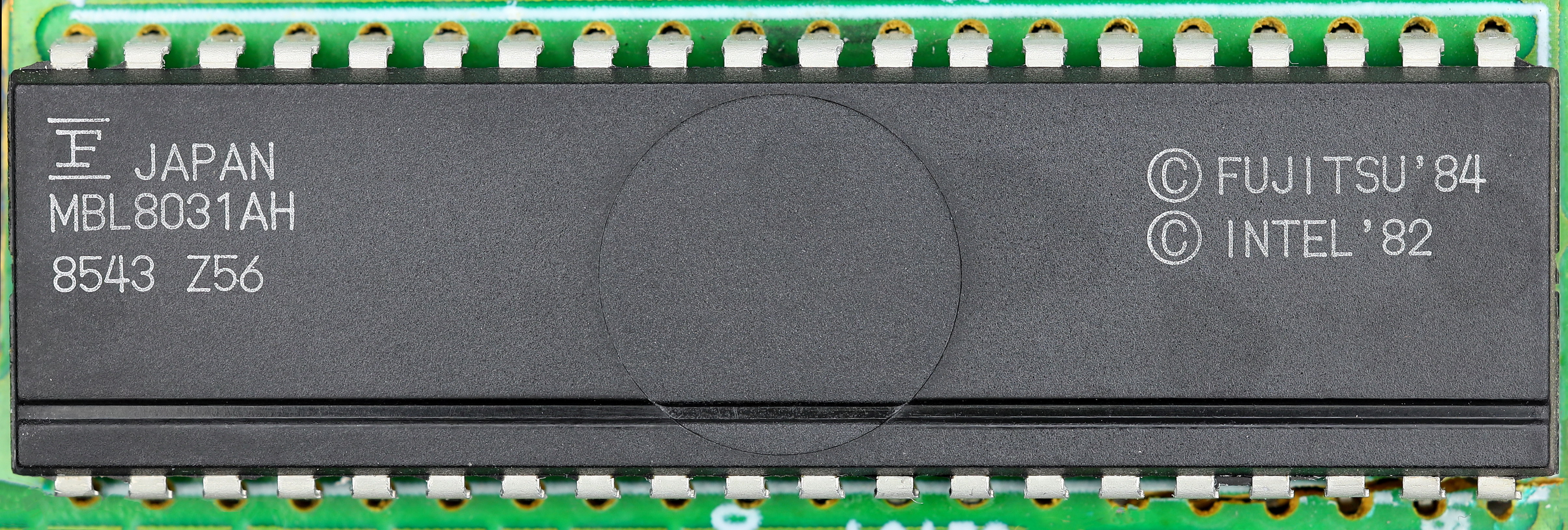
Fujitsu MBL8031AH

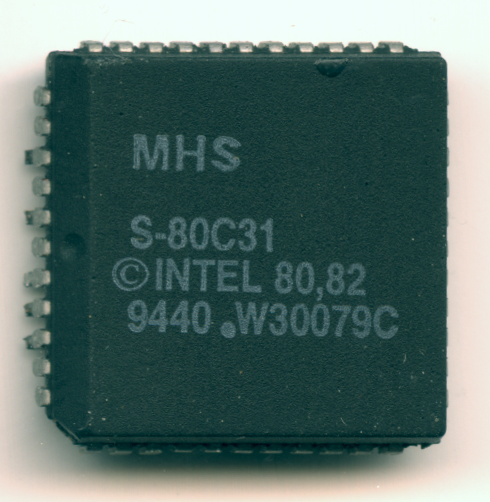
MHS S-80C31

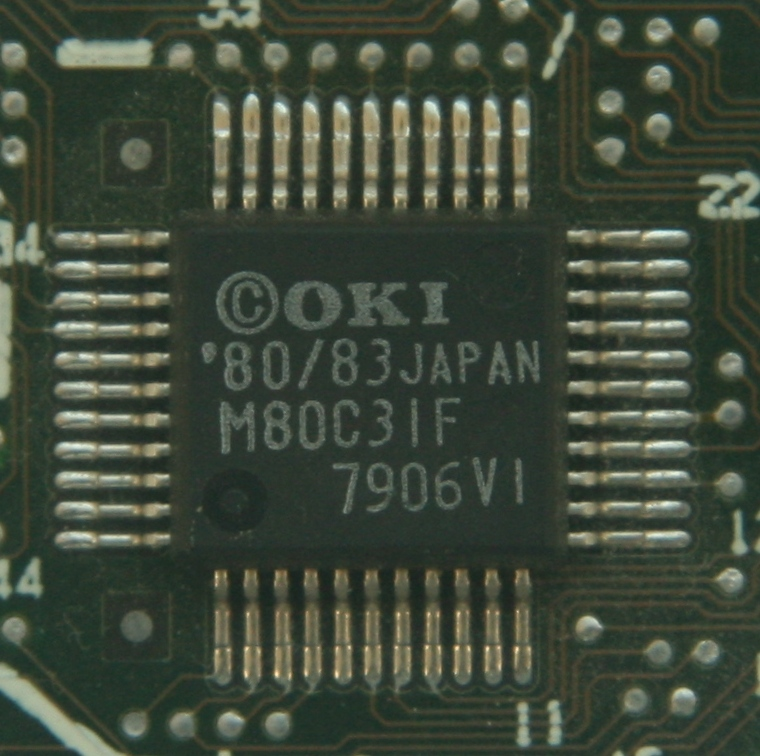
OKI M80C31

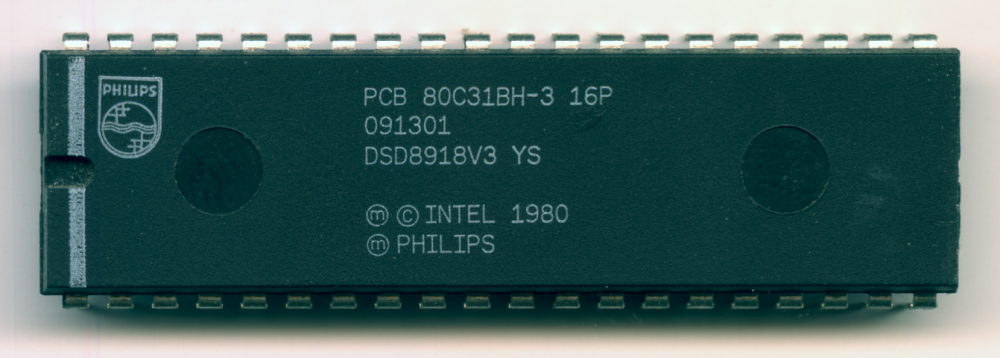
Philips PCB80C31

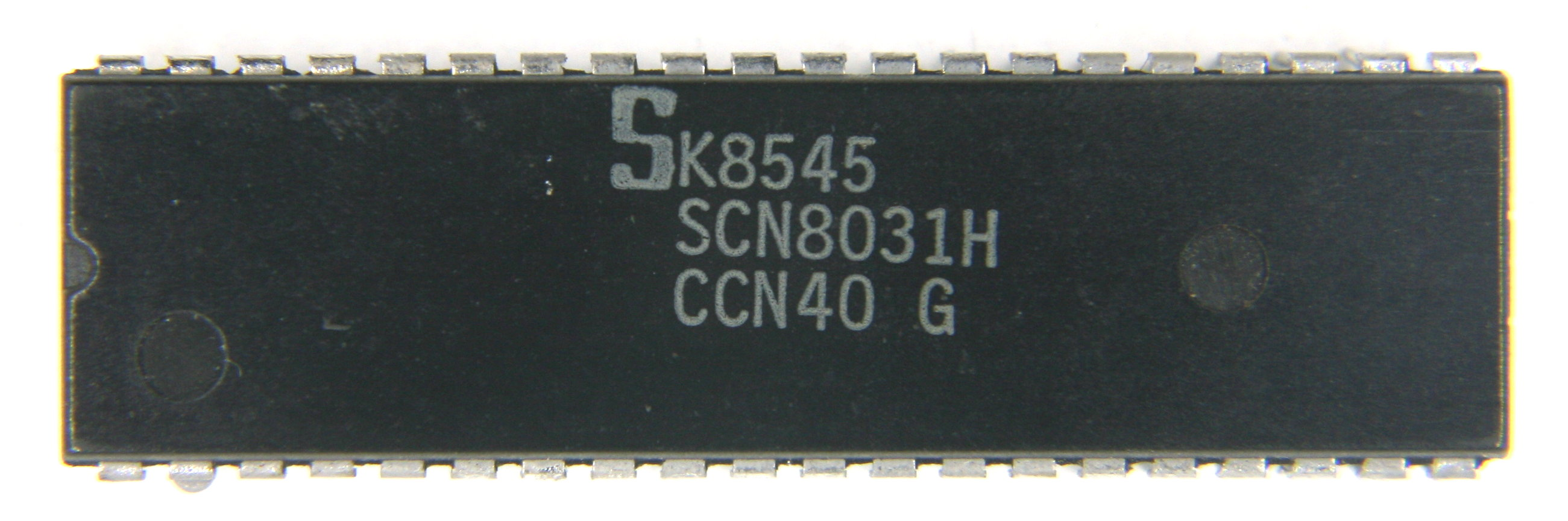
Signetics SCN8031

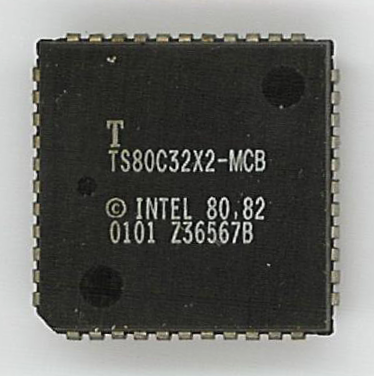
Temic TS80C32X2

=== Derivative vendors ===
More than 20 independent manufacturers produce MCS-51 compatible processors.

Intel MCS-51 derived microcontrollers

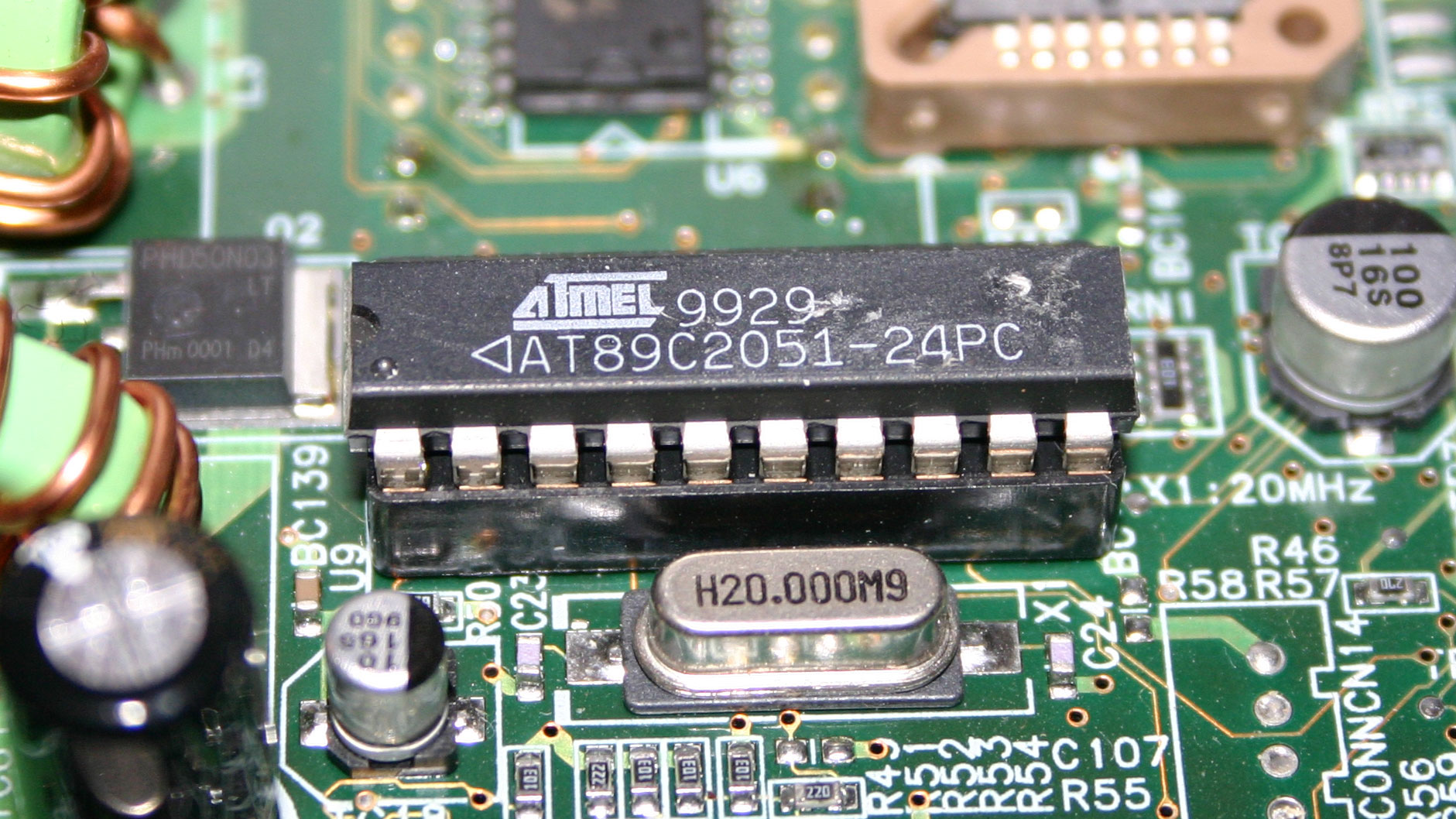
Atmel AT89C2051

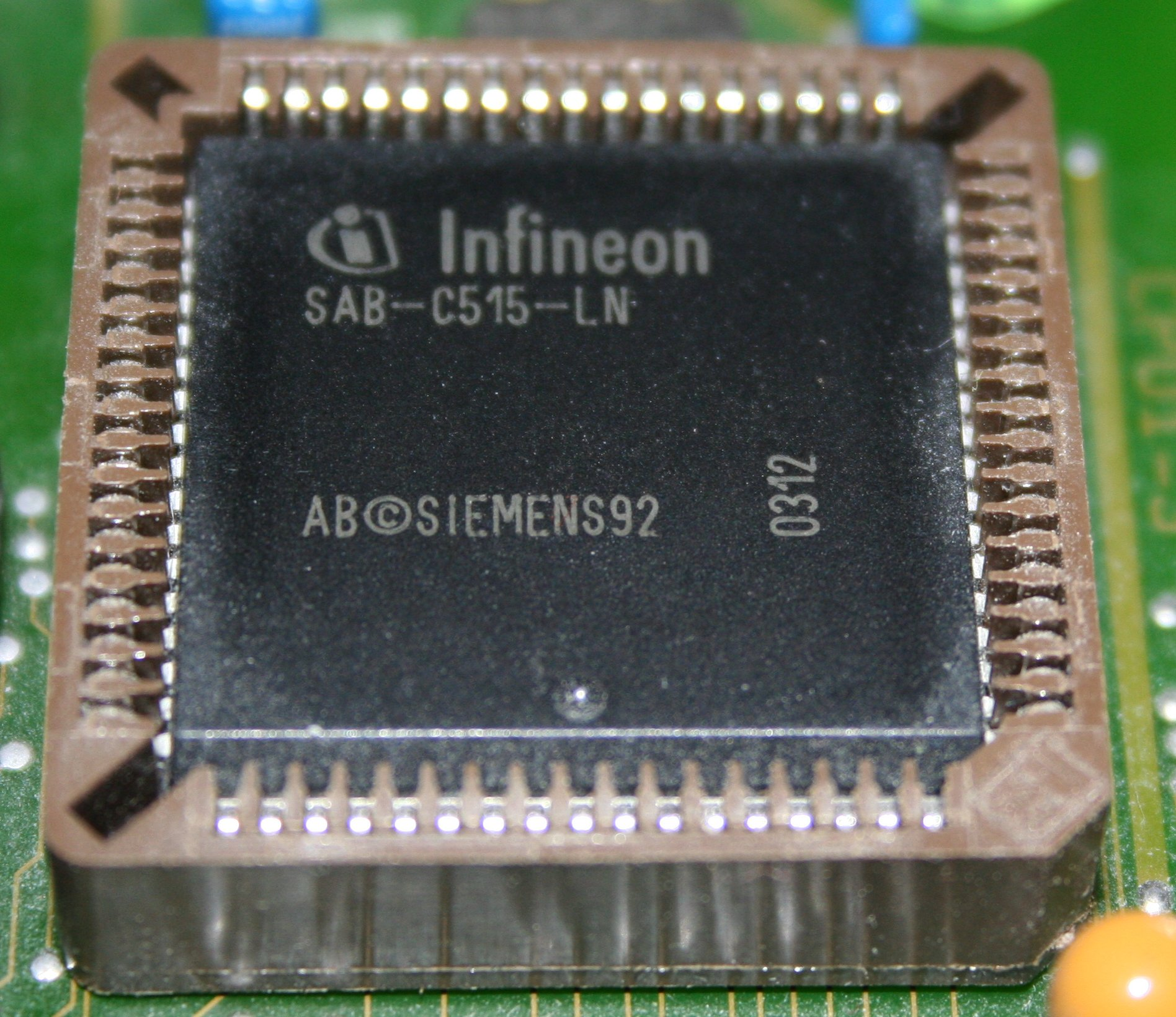
Infineon SAB-C515

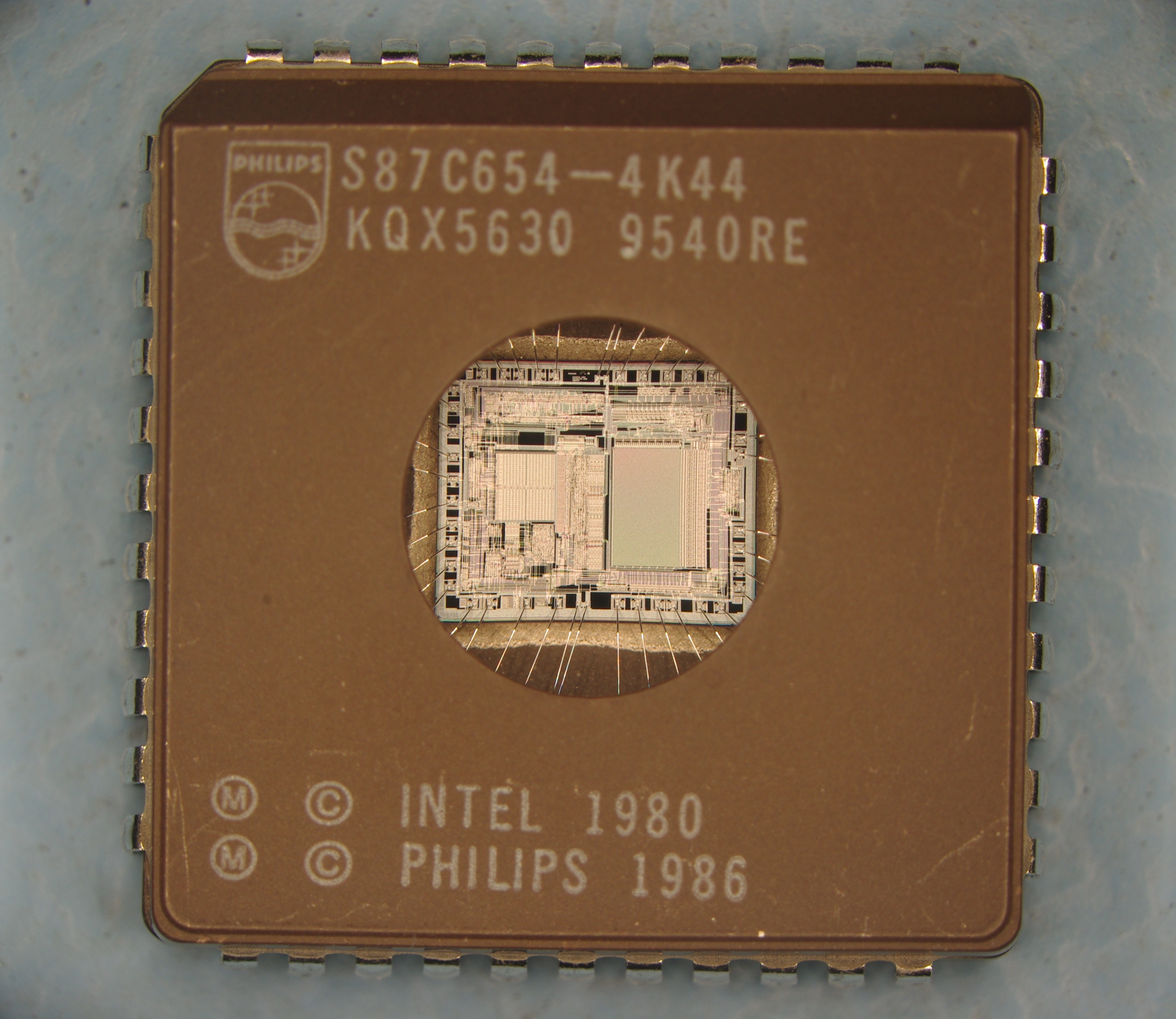
Philips S87C654

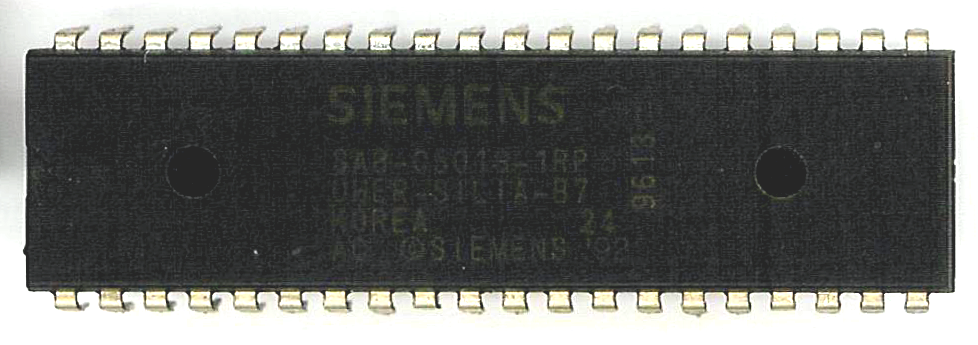
Siemens SAB-C501

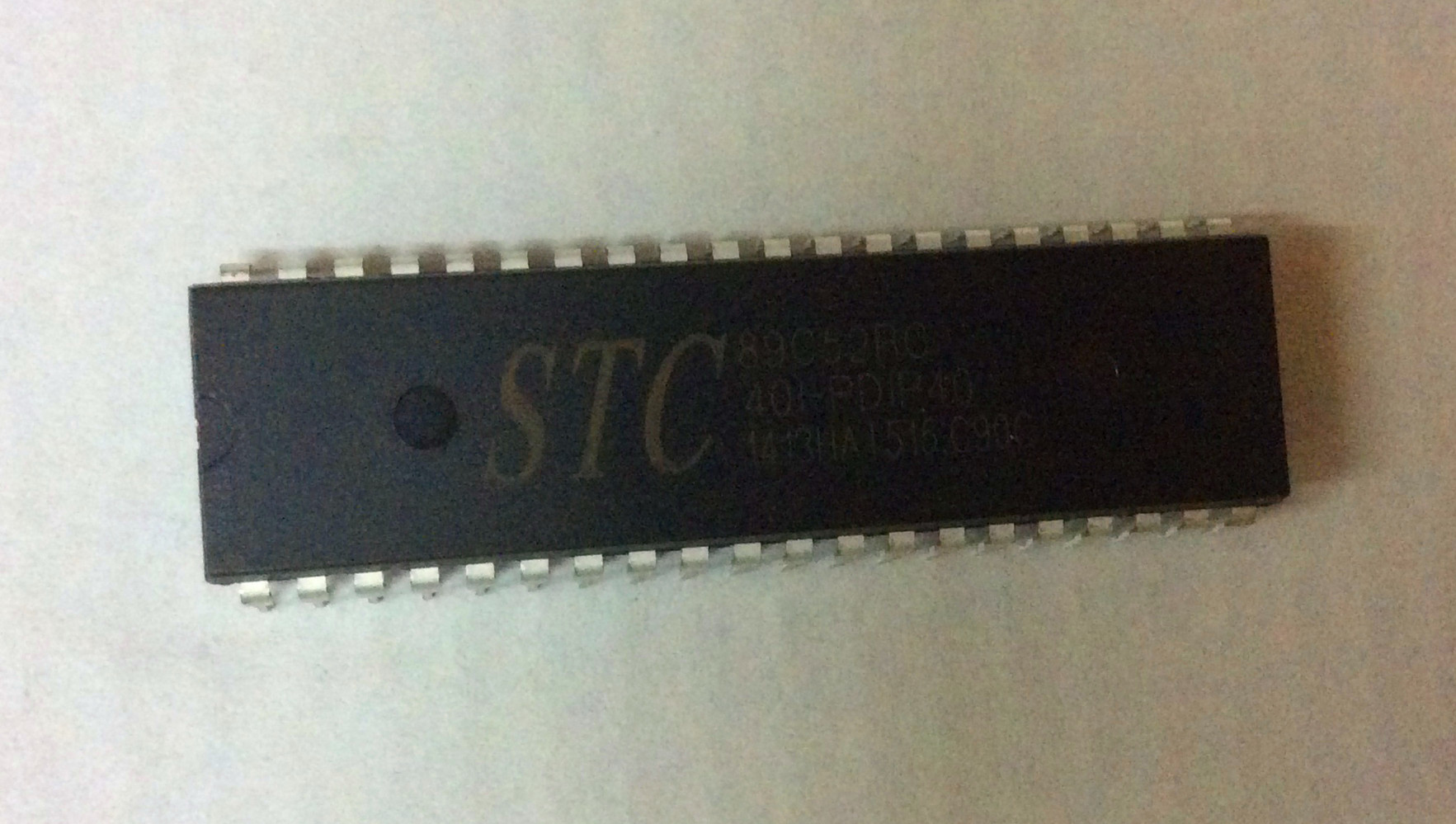
STC Micro STC89C52

Other ICs or IPs compatible with the MCS-51 have been developed by Analog Devices, Integral Minsk, Kristall Kyiv, and NIIET Voronezh.

== Use as intellectual property ==
Today, 8051s are still available as discrete parts, but they are mostly used as silicon intellectual property cores. Available in hardware description language source code (such as VHDL or Verilog) or FPGA netlist forms, these cores are typically integrated within embedded systems, in products ranging from USB flash drives to washing machines to complex wireless communication systems on a chip. Designers use 8051 silicon IP cores, because of the smaller size, and lower power, compared to 32-bit processors like ARM Cortex-M series, MIPS and BA22.

Subsequent 8051 core designs have increased performance while retaining compatibility with the original MCS-51 instruction set. The original Intel 8051 was a microcode engine using 12 clocked microcode cycles per machine cycle to minimize the number of NMOS logic gates consuming power in passive resistive pull-ups. Most instructions executed in one or two machine cycles. At the typical maximum clock frequency of 12 MHz, the original 8051 types execute one million single-cycle instructions, or 500,000 two-cycle instructions, per second. The change to CMOS using active P-channel FET pull-ups makes it possible to realize the core without microcode. Enhanced 8051 IP cores run at one clock cycle per machine cycle. With clock frequencies of up to 450 MHz an 8051-compatible processor can execute up to 450 million instructions per second.

== MCUs based on 8051 ==
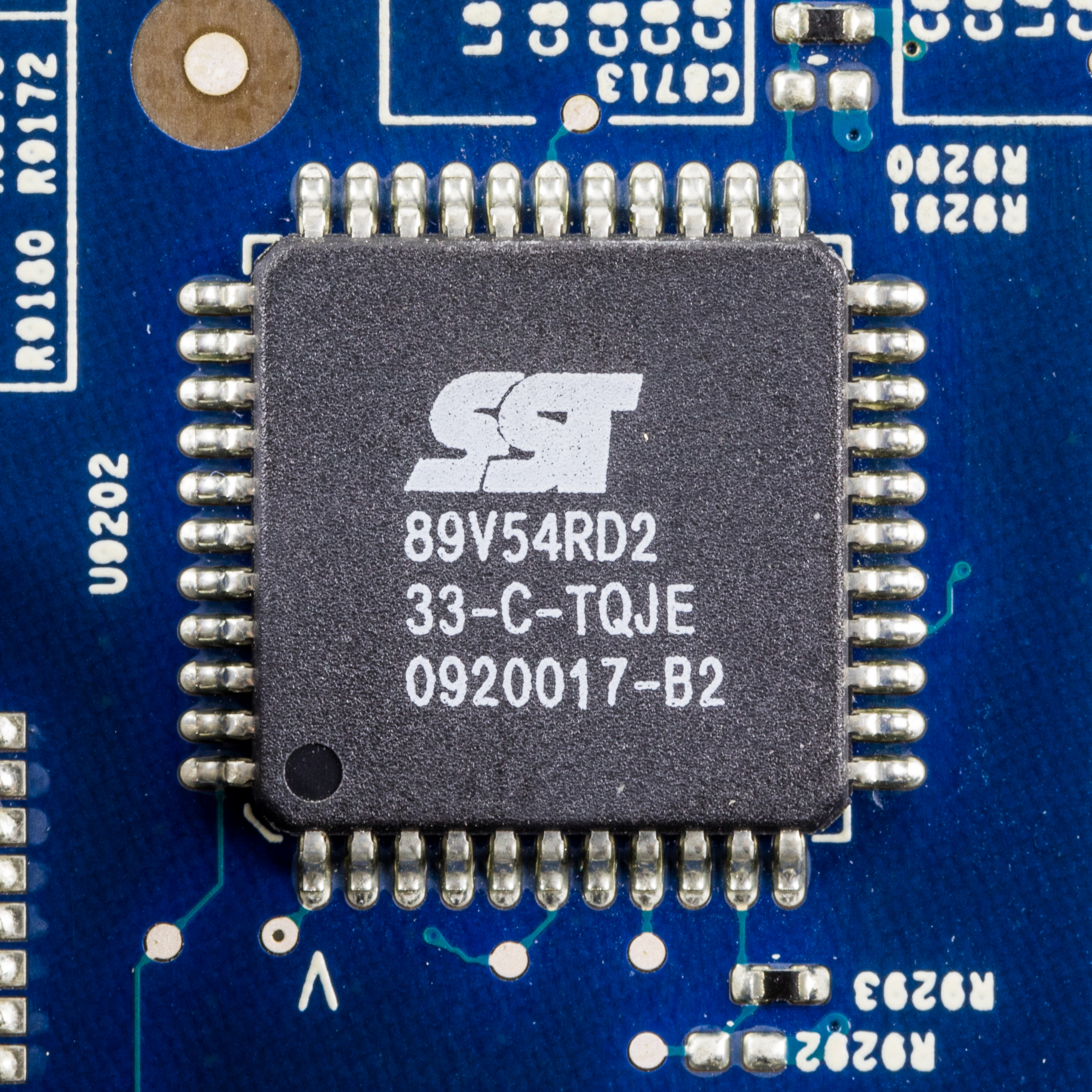
Silicon Storage Technology 89V54RD2

- ABOV: MC94F, MC95F, MC96F series
- Analog Devices (formerly Maxim Integrated, originally Dallas): DS80-series etc.
- Cypress PSoC CY8C3xxxx series, which has a dedicated USB 2.0 interface
- Jin Rui (brand CACHIP): CA51Fx family 8-bit MCUs.
- Infineon: XC800
- Mentor Graphics: M8051EW etc. designed for Mentor by SYNTILL8
- Megawin: 74, 82, 84, 86, 87, and 89 series
- Microchip (formerly Atmel): AT89C51, AT89S51, AT83C5134, etc.
- NXP: NXP700 and NXP900 series
- Siemens 8-bit: SAB 8035/8048, SAB 80512/80532, SAB 80513, SAB 8352-2/8352-5, SAB 80(C)515/80(C)535, SAB 83515, SAB 80(C)517/80(C)537, SAB 8051A/8031A, SAB 8052A/8032A, SAB 8052B/8032B, SAB80C52/80C32, SDA 30C164-2 (ROMless)
- Silergy electricity metering SoCs: 71M6511, 71M6513, 71M6531, 71M6533, 71M6534, 71M6542, 71M6543 Energy measurement SoCs: 78M6631, 78M6618, 78M6613, 78M6612
- Silicon Labs: C8051 series and EFM8 series
- Silicon Storage Technology: FlashFlex51 MCU (SST89E52RD2, SST89E54RD2, SST89E58RD2, SST89E516RD2SST89V52RD2, SST89V54RD2, SST89V58RD2, SST89V516RD2)
- STC Micro: STC89C51RC, STC90C51RC, STC90C58AD, STC10F08XE, STC11F60XE, STC12C5410AD, STC12C5202AD, STC12C5A60S2, STC12C5628AD, STC15F100, STC15F204EA, STC15F2K60S2, STC15F4K60S2, STC15F101W, STC15F408AD, STC15W104, STC15W408S, STC15W201S, STC15W408AS, STC15W1K16S and STC15W4K56S4 series
- Taifatech TF470, single-cycle RISC backend
- Texas Instruments CC111x, CC24xx and CC25xx families of RF SoCs
- WCH (Nanjing Qinheng Microelectronics): CH551, CH552, CH554, CH546, CH547, CH548, CH558, CH559

== Digital signal processor (DSP) variants ==
Several variants with an additional 16-bit digital signal processor (DSP) (for example for MP3 or Vorbis coding/decoding) with up to 675 million instructions per second (MIPS) and integrated USB 2.0 interface or as intellectual property exist.

== Enhanced 8-bit binary compatible microcontroller: MCS-151 family ==
In 1996 Intel announced the MCS-151 family, an up to 6 times faster variant, that's fully binary and instruction set compatible with 8051. Unlike their 8051, MCS-151 is a pipelined CPU, with 16-bit internal code bus and is 6x the speed. The MCS-151 family was also discontinued by Intel, but is widely available in binary compatible and partly enhanced variants.

== 8/16/32-bit binary compatible microcontroller: MCS-251 family ==
The 80251 8/16/32-bit microcontroller with 16 MB (24-bit) address-space and six times faster instruction cycle was introduced by Intel in 1996. It can perform as an 8-bit 8051, has 24-bit linear addressing, an 8-bit ALU, 8-bit instructions, 16-bit instructions, a limited set of 32-bit instructions, 16 8-bit registers, 16 16-bit registers (8 of which overlap with pairs of 8-bit registers), and 10 32-bit registers (8 of which overlap with pairs of 16-bit registers).

It features extended instructions and later variants with higher performance. It is also available as intellectual property (IP). It is 3-stage pipelined. The MCS-251 family was also discontinued by Intel, but is widely available in binary compatible and partly enhanced variants from many manufacturers.

The 80251 new instructions are assigned opcodes in the range x8–xF, and are selected using the formerly unused opcode A5 as an opcode prefix in one of two ways:

- In "binary mode," operation is fully 8051 compatible, and all new instructions must be prefixed with A5.
- In "source mode," existing 8051 code must have an A5 prefix byte added to all 8051 instructions in the range x6–xF. (This is usually done by the assembler.) Unprefixed opcode bytes in this range encode the new 80251 instructions. (Opcode bytes x6–x7 are not assigned, but are available for future expansion.)

Generally, the new 80251 instructions are two bytes long (not including the A5 prefix), with the first byte specifying the operation, and the second encoding two 4-bit register operands, or one register operand and four additional opcode bits.

== See also ==
- DS80C390
- Hitachi HD44780 - LCD controller with XRAM-compatible interface
- Intel PL/M-51
- SDK-51 system design kit
