= Tini =

Tini may refer to:

- Tiny Internet Interface, a microcontroller that includes the facilities necessary to connect to the Internet
- Titanium nitride, an extremely hard ceramic material, often used as a coating to improve surface properties
- Tini, Iran, a village in Kermanshah Province, Iran
- Tini (album), 2016 debut solo album by Tini
- Tini Tini Tini, 2020 studio album by Tini

People

- Tinì Cansino (born 1959), stage name of Photina Lappa, Greek actress and television personality, mainly active in Italy
- Tini Kerei Taiaroa (1846–1934), New Zealand personality and community worker
- Tini Wagner (1919-2004), Dutch freestyle swimmer
- Clelia Tini (born 1992), Sammarinese swimmer
- Jody Tini (born 1976), New Zealand female basketball player
- Tini (singer) (born 1997), Argentine actress, singer-songwriter, dancer and model, also known for her lead role in Disney's series Violetta

Other

- tini (software), alternative init included in Docker
