= DS80C390 =

8051-compatible microcontroller with dual CAN 2.0B controllers

The DS80C390 is a microcontroller, introduced by Dallas Semiconductor (later part of Maxim Integrated Products, now part of Analog Devices), whose architecture is derived from that of the Intel MCS-51 (a.k.a. 8051) processor series. It contains a code memory address space of twenty-two bits. It also contains two Controller Area Network (CAN) controllers and a 32-bit integer coprocessor.

The open-source Small Device C Compiler (SDCC) supports the processor. It was used in the initial version of the Tiny Internet Interface (TINI) processor module where it was superseded by the DS80C400, a processor that also incorporates an Ethernet port.
