= Multi-cycle processor =

A multi-cycle processor is a processor that carries out one instruction over multiple clock cycles, often without starting a new instruction in that time (as opposed to a pipelined processor).

== See also ==
- Single-cycle processor, a processor executing (and finishing) one instruction per clock cycle
