= Atmel AT89 series =

Intel 8051-compatible family of 8 bit microcontrollers

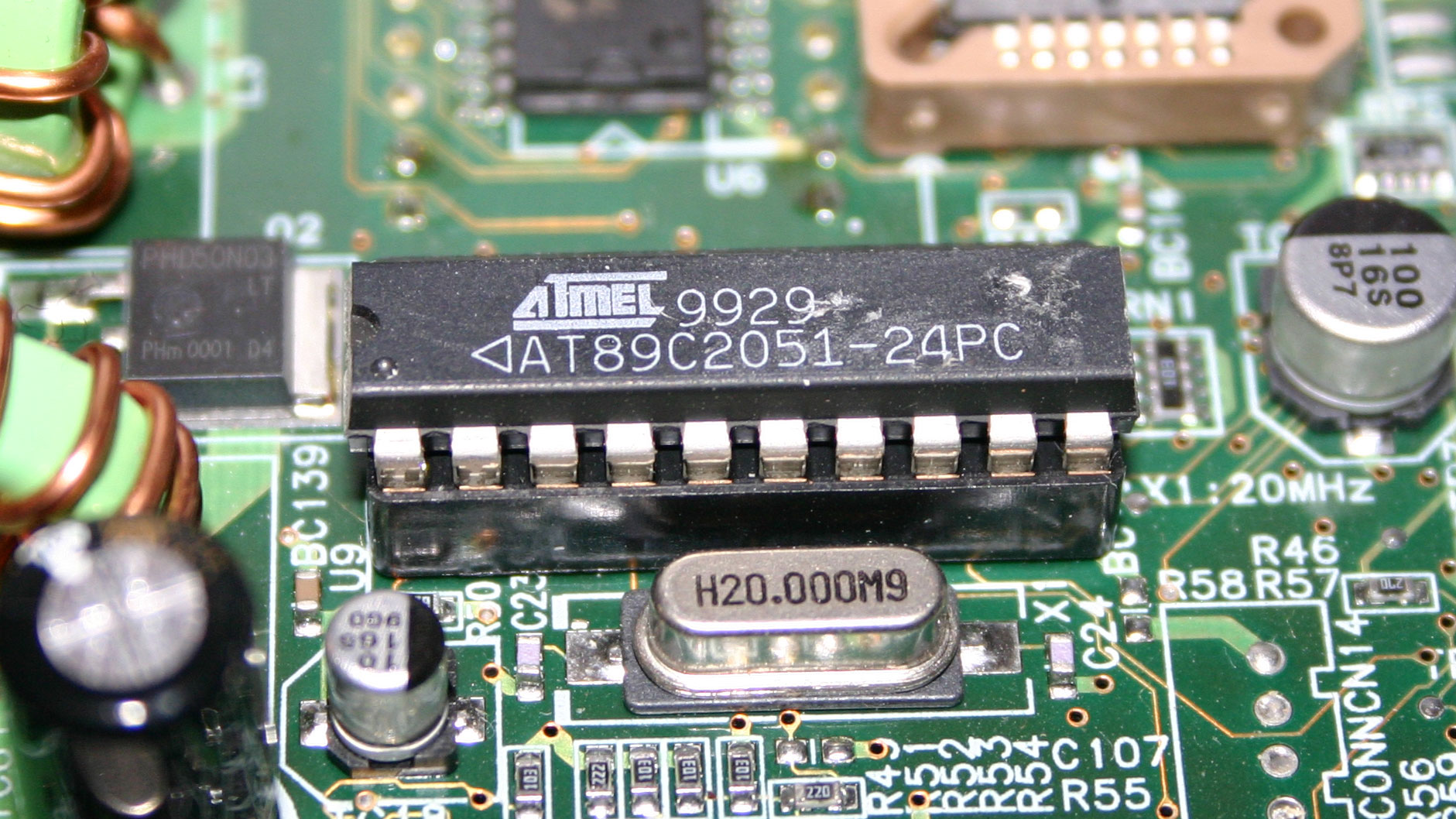
An AT89c2051 microcontroller in circuit

The Atmel AT89 series is an Intel 8051-compatible family of 8-bit microcontrollers (μCs) that were manufactured by the Atmel Corporation. Microchip Technology purchased Atmel in April 2016 and manufactures the AT89 series.

Based on the Intel 8051 core, the AT89 series remains very popular as general purpose microcontrollers, due to their industry standard instruction set, their low unit cost, and the availability of these chips in DIL (DIP) packages. This allows a great amount of legacy code to be reused without modification in new applications. While less powerful than the newer AT90 series of AVR RISC microcontrollers, new product development has continued with the AT89 series for the aforementioned advantages.

More recently, the AT89 series has been augmented with 8051-cored special function microcontrollers, specifically in the areas of USB, I²C (two wire interface), SPI and CAN bus controllers, MP3 decoders and hardware PWM.

Atmel has also created an LP (low power) series of these chips with a "Single Cycle Core", making the execution speed of these chips considerably faster.

== AT89 Series Microcontrollers ==
Device name	Flash	RAM/XRAM	EEPROM	max. Frequency	VCC	Pins	Packages	Notes	Publish
AT80C51RD2	64KB	1024B	-none-	40MHz	3-5V	40, 44	PDIP, TQFP, PLCC		A 09/2002
AT83C5134	8KB ROM	1024B	only MLF package	48MHz	3V	28, 32, 48, 64	SOIC, QFN, MLF, VQFP	SPI, TWI, USB 2.0	B 03/2007
AT83C5135	16KB ROM	1024B	only MLF package	48MHz	3V	28, 32, 48, 64	SOIC, QFN, MLF, VQFP	SPI, TWI, USB 2.0	B 03/2007
AT83C5136	32KB ROM	1024B	only MLF package	48MHz	3V	28, 32, 48, 64	SOIC, QFN, MLF, VQFP	SPI, TWI, USB 2.0	B 03/2007
AT83EB5114	4KB ROM	256B	256B	24MHz	3V	20, 24	SOIC		A 01/2005
AT89C1051	1KB	64B	-none-	24MHz	3-5V	20	PDIP, SOIC		D 12/1997
AT89C2051	2KB	128B	-none-	24MHz	3-5V	20	PDIP, SOIC		E 02/2000
AT89C4051	4KB	128B	-none-	24MHz	3-5V	20	PDIP, SOIC		E 02/2000
AT89C51	4KB	128B	-none-	24MHz	5V	40, 44	PDIP, TQFP, PLCC		F 12/1997
AT89C52	8KB	256B	-none-	24MHz	5V	40, 44	PDIP, TQFP, PLCC		F 12/1997
AT89C55	20KB	256B	-none-	33MHz	5V	40, 44	PDIP, TQFP, PLCC		D 12/1997
AT89C55WD	20KB	256B	-none-	33MHz	5V	40, 44	PDIP, TQFP, PLCC	WatchDog	B 09/2002
AT89C5115	16KB	256B/256B	2KB	40MHz	3-5V	24, 28, 32	SOIC, PLCC, QFP		F 05/2006
AT89C5130A-M	16KB	1024B	4KB	48MHz	3-5V	32, 52, 64	QFN, PLCC, VQFP	SPI, TWI, USB 2.0	03/2003
AT89C5131A-L	32KB	1024B	4KB	48MHz	3V	32, 52, 64	QFN, PLCC, VQFP	SPI, TWI, USB 2.0	03/2003
AT89C5131A-M	32KB	1024B	4KB	48MHz	3-5V	32, 52, 64	QFN, PLCC, VQFP	SPI, TWI, USB 2.0	03/2003
AT89C51AC2	32KB	1024B	2KB	40MHz	3-5V	44	VQFP, PLCC		04/2001
AT89C51AC3	64KB	2048B	2KB	60MHz	3-5V	44, 52, 64	VQFP, PLCC		A 10/2004
AT89C51ED2	64KB	256B/1792B	2KB	60MHz	3-5V	40, 44, 64, 68	PDIP, PLCC, VQFP		07/2003; E 04/2004
AT89C51IC2	32KB	256B/1KB	-none-	60MHz	3V, 5V	44	PLC, VQFP	TWI	A 01/2004
AT89C51ID2	64KB	256B/1792B	-none-	60MHz	3-5V	44, 64, 68	PLC, VQFP	TWI	A 09/2003
AT89C51RC	32KB	512B	-none-	33MHz	5V	40, 44	PDIP, TQFP, PLCC		B 11/2002
AT89C51RD2	64KB	256B/1792B	-none-	60MHz	3-5V	40, 44, 64, 68	PDIP, PLCC, VQFP		07/2003; E 04/2004
AT89EB5114	4KB	256B	256B	24MHz	3V	20, 24	SOIC	Inside AT24C02	A 01/2005
AT89LP213	2KB	128B	-none-	20MHz	2.4-5V	14	PDIP, TSSOP	no UART	A 07/2006
AT89LP214	2KB	128B	-none-	20MHz	2.4-5V	14	PDIP, TSSOP		A 07/2006
AT89LP216	2KB	128B	-none-	20MHz	2.4-5V	16	PDIP, SOIC, TSSOP		A 06/2006
AT89LP2052	2KB	256B	-none-	20MHz	2.4-5V	20	PDIP, SOIC, TSSOP		A 03/2005
AT89LP3240	32KB	256B/4KB	-none-	20MHz	2.4-3.6V	40, 44	PDIP, TQFP, PLCC, VQFN, MLF		C 02/2011
AT89LP4052	4KB	256B	-none-	20MHz	2.4-5V	20	PDIP, SOIC, TSSOP		A 03/2005
AT89LP428	4KB	256B/512B	512B Flash	20MHz	2.4-5V	28, 32	PDIP, TQFP, PLCC, MLF		A 08/2009
AT89LP51	4KB	256B	256B Flash	12MHz	2.7V-5V	40, 44	PDIP, TQFP, PLCC		B 12/2010
AT89LP52	8KB	256B	256B Flash	12MHz	2.7V-5V	40, 44	PDIP, TQFP, PLCC		B 12/2010
AT89LP6440	64KB	256B/4KB	-none-	20MHz	2.4-3.6V	40, 44	PDIP, TQFP, PLCC, VQFN, MLF		C 02/2011
AT89LP828	8KB	256B/512B	1KB Flash	20MHz	2.4-5V	28, 32	PDIP, TQFP, PLCC, MLF		A 08/2009
AT89LS51	4KB	128B	-none-	16MHz	3V	40, 44	PDIP, TQFP, PLCC	ISP, SPI	A 05/2002
AT89LS52	8KB	256B	-none-	16MHz	3V	40, 44	PDIP, TQFP, PLCC	ISP, SPI	A 12/2001
AT89LS53	12KB	256B	-none-	12MHz	2.7V-5V	40, 44	PDIP, TQFP, PLCC	ISP, SPI	C 03/2006
AT89LS8252	8KB	256B	2KB	12MHz	3-5V	40, 44	PDIP, TQFP, PLCC	ISP, SPI	C 03/2006
AT89LV51	4KB	128B	-none-	12MHz	2.7V-5V	40, 44	PDIP, TQFP, PLCC	ISP, SPI	? 12/1997
AT89LV52	8KB	256B	-none-	12MHz	2.7V-5V	40, 44	PDIP, TQFP, PLCC	ISP, SPI	? 12/1997
AT89LV55	20KB	256B	-none-	12MHz	2.7V-5V	40, 44	PDIP, TQFP, PLCC	ISP, SPI	? 12/1997
AT89S2051	2KB	256B	-none-	24MHz	3-5V	20	PDIP, SOIC	ISP, SPI	C 07/2005
AT89S4051	4KB	256B	-none-	24MHz	3-5V	20	PDIP, SOIC	ISP, SPI	C 07/2005
AT89S4D12	4KB	256B	128KB Flash	12MHz	3.3V	28. 32	SOIC, PLCC	Inside AT29LV010A	A 12/1997
AT89S51	4KB	128B	-none-	33MHz	5V	40, 44	PDIP, TQFP, PLCC	ISP, SPI	A 10/2001
AT89S52	8KB	256B	-none-	33MHz	5V	40, 44	PDIP, TQFP, PLCC	ISP, SPI	A 07/2001
AT89S53	12KB	256B	-none-	24MHz	5V	40, 44	PDIP, TQFP, PLCC	ISP, SPI	E 03/2006
AT89S8252	8KB	256B	2KB	24MHz	5V	40, 44	PDIP, TQFP, PLCC	ISP, SPI	F 11/2003
AT89S8253	12KB	256B	2KB	24MHz	3-5V	40, 44	PDIP, TQFP, PLCC	ISP, SPI	H 09/2005

== Port structures and operation ==
All four ports in the AT89C51 and AT89C52 are bidirectional. Each consists of a latch (Special Function Registers P0 through P3), an output driver, and an input buffer. The output drivers of Ports 0 and 2, and the input buffers of Port 0, are used in accesses to external memory. In this application, Port 0 outputs the low byte of the external memory address, time-multiplexed with the byte being written or read. Port 2 outputs the high byte of the external memory address when the address is 16 bits wide. Otherwise the Port 2 pins continue to emit the P2 SFR content. All the Port 3 pins, and two Port 1 pins (in the AT89C52)are multifunctional. The alternate functions can only be activated if the corresponding bit latch in the port SFR contains a 1. Otherwise the port pin is stuck at 0.
