= Tiny Internet Interface =

Microcontroller that connects to the Internet

The Tiny Internet Interface (known as TINI or MxTNI) is a microcontroller that includes the facilities necessary to connect to the Internet. The MxTNI platform is a microcontroller-based development platform that executes code for embedded web servers. The platform is a combination of broad-based I/O, a full TCP/IP stack, and an extensible Java runtime environment that simplifies development of network-connected equipment.

MxTNI was developed by Dallas Semiconductor, which is now known as Maxim Integrated Products. The interface was originally known as "TINI". The company renamed it MxTNI in December 2011.
