= Internal RAM =

Internal RAM, or IRAM or on-chip RAM (OCRAM), is the address range of RAM that is internal to the CPU. Some object files contain an .iram section.

== Internal RAM (Random-Access Memory) ==
=== History of Random-Access Memory (RAM) ===
Earlier forms of what we have today as DRAM started as drum memory which was an early form of memory for computers. The drum would have to be pre-loaded with data and small heads in the drum would read and write the pre-loaded information. After drum memory came Magnetic-core memory which would store information using the polarity of ferrite donuts' magnetic fields. Through these early trial and errors of computing memory, the final result was Dynamic Random Access Memory which we use today in our devices. Dynamic Random Access Memory or (RAM) was first invented in 1968 by Robert Dennard. He was born in Texas and is an engineer who created one of the first models of (RAM) which was first called Dynamic Random Access Memory. His invention led to computers being able to reach a new era of technological advancement.

=== General Information about RAM ===
Random Access Memory is memory storage that if found in electronic devices such as computers. It holds data while the computer is on so that it can be quickly accessed by the CPU or (Central Processing Unit). Ram is different from regular storage units such as Hard Disks, Solid State Drives, and Solid State Hybrid Drives. While these types of drives hold much permanent information, RAM holds temporary, yet important, information for the computer to receive. While using very minimal programs such as a browser or having a couple of programs open, a RAM is working so that it can load up small tasks like these. However when opening up bigger programs and more tabs for a computer to work harder the information is shifted from the RAM to other drives such as the hard disk.

=== Technical Properties of RAM ===
Generally, IRAM is composed of very high speed SRAM located alongside of the CPU. It acts similar to a CPU cache, but is software addressable. This saves transistors and power, and is potentially much faster, but forces programmers to specifically allocate it in order to benefit. In contrast, cache is invisible to the programmer. Associated with speed, the more RAM there is in the system, the faster the computer can run, because it allows the RAM to run more information through to the computer's (CPU). Not only does adding more RAM to a computer help it run faster, it helps boots up a computer immensely faster compared to booting up a system with less RAM. Another important factor of speed has to do with how fast transfer rate speeds are. For example a stick of RAM that has only 512 megabytes of transfer speed is too slow compared to a stick of RAM that has 16 gigabytes of transfer speeds. Not only does the transfer speeds depend of how fast a RAM can process information, the type of stick of RAM depends as well. For example, there are sticks that can be used DDR3, DDR4 and DDR5. Between these three models the DDR3 is the oldest and has slower speed compared to DDR4 which most computer run nowadays DDR4 has a slower speed compared the DDR5 ram which uses less power and has double the bandwidth compared to the DDR4 RAM.
