= Single-cycle processor =

A single cycle processor is a processor that carries out one instruction in a single clock cycle.

== See also ==
- Complex instruction set computer, a processor executing one instruction in multiple clock cycles
- DLX, a very similar architecture designed by John L. Hennessy (creator of MIPS) for teaching purposes
- MIPS architecture, MIPS-32 architecture
- MIPS-X, developed as a follow-on project to the MIPS architecture
- Reduced instruction set computer, a processor executing one instruction in minimal clock cycles
