= Dallas Semiconductor =

Defunct American semiconductor company (1984-2002)

- Industry: Semiconductors, Electronics
- Founded: 1984, February
- Founder: Vin Prothro (CEO)
- Defunct: 2001
- Fate: Acquired by Maxim Integrated
- Headquarters: Dallas, Texas, United States
- Products: Integrated Circuits
- Parent: Maxim Integrated
- Website: dalsemi.com at the Wayback Machine (archived 2000-10-18)

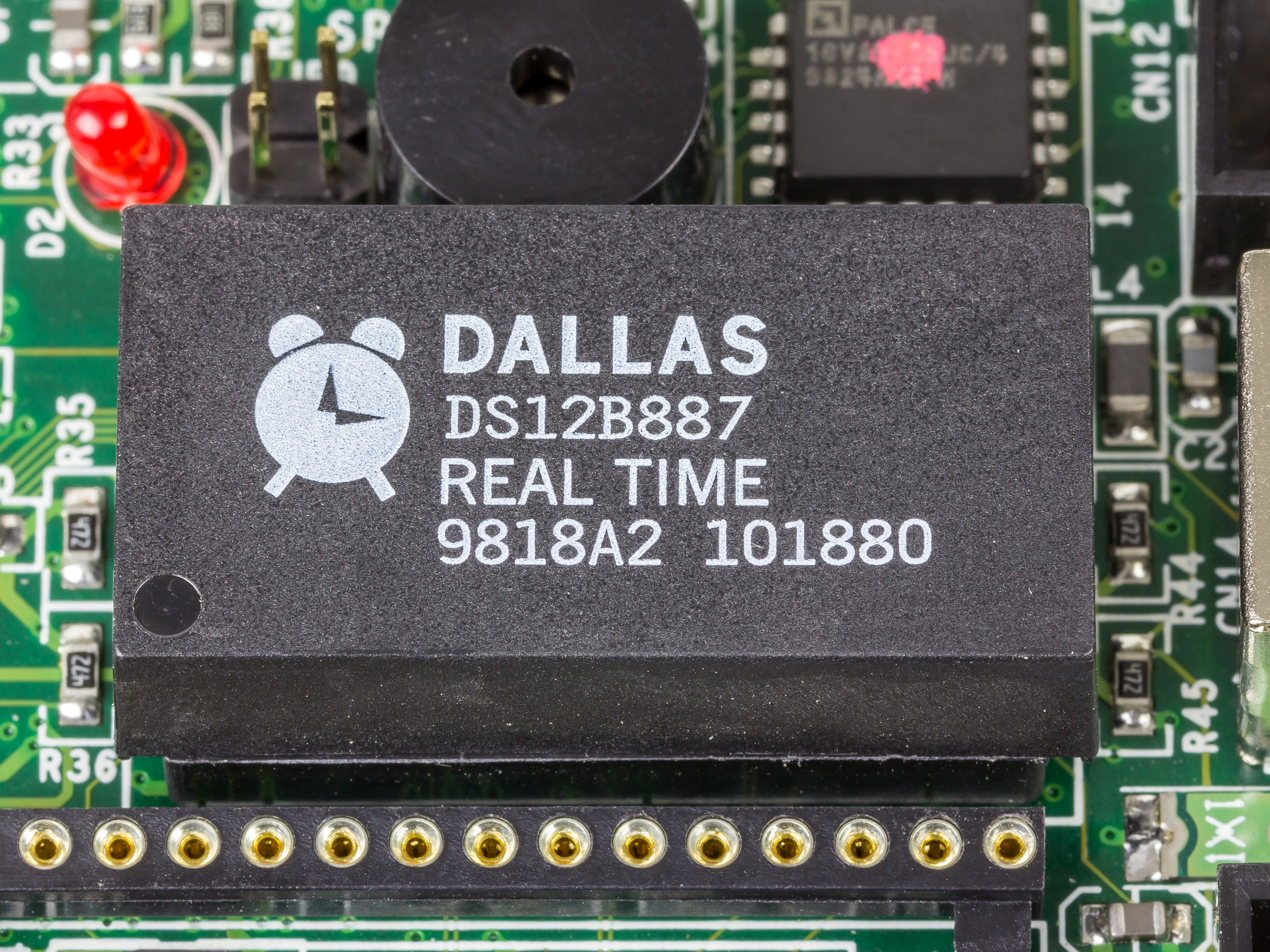
Real Time Clock DS12B887

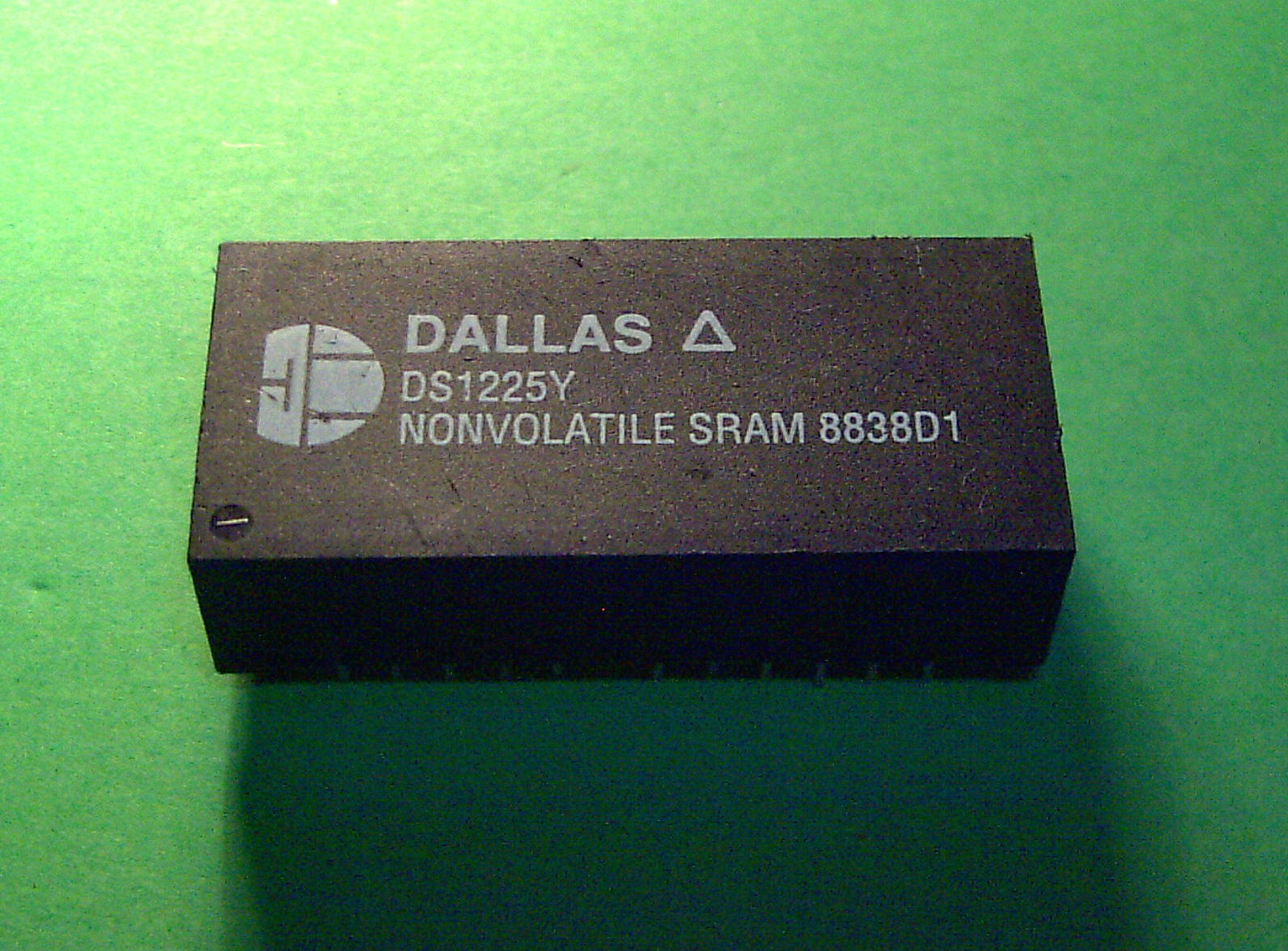
64 kB non-volatile SRAM DS1225

Dallas Semiconductor, founded in 1984, acquired by Maxim Integrated in 2002, then acquired by Analog Devices in 2021, was a company that designed and manufactured analog, digital, and mixed-signal semiconductors (integrated circuits, or ICs). Its specialties included communications products (including T/E and Ethernet products), microcontrollers, battery management, thermal sensing and thermal management, non-volatile random-access memory, microprocessor supervisors, delay lines, silicon oscillators, digital potentiometers, real-time clocks, temperature-compensated crystal oscillators (TCXOs), iButton, and 1-Wire products.

== History ==
The company, based in Dallas, Texas, was founded in 1984 and purchased by Maxim Integrated Products for $2.5 billion in 2001. Both the Maxim and Dallas Semiconductor brands were actively used until 2007. Since then, the Maxim name has been used for all new products, though the Dallas Semiconductor brand has been retained for some older products, which can be identified by "DS" at the beginning of their part numbers, for example the 1-Wire communications protocol devices.

Notable products by the company included the DS80-series microcontrollers with 8051 instruction set.

Dallas Semiconductor devices were still actively produced by Maxim Integrated through June of 2021. In August 2021, Maxim was then acquired by Analog Devices.

Farmers Branch Texas building site:

- Dallas Semiconductor - 1985 to 2001
- Maxim Integrated - 2001 to 2017
- Qorvo - 2017 to 2023
- Wolfspeed - 2023 to current
