= Jack E. Volder =

American electrical engineer

Jack Edward Volder (1924–2013) was an American electrical engineer. He is best known for inventing the CORDIC algorithm.

Jack Volder was born in Fort Worth, Texas. During World War II, he served as a B-24 flight engineer. After the war, he studied electrical engineering, graduating from Texas Technological College in 1949. He first joined Allis-Chalmers in Milwaukee, Wisconsin before returning to Fort Worth to work at Convair in 1951, where he worked in the aeroelectronics department. Here he initiated research into the CORDIC algorithm in 1956. It was used in specialized flight control and radar computer systems. In 1959, he published a highly cited description of the algorithm. Volder left Convair before completion of the first such computer in 1961, but did occasional consulting for them. In 1971, he joined Litton Data Systems in California, working on the AN/UYK-7 computer. In 1975 he joined Hughes Aircraft Company. He married in 1949 and had children and grandchildren.

== See also ==
- CORDIC
- Avionics
