= X87 =

Subset of x86 instruction set architecture for floating-point arithmetic

x87 is a floating-point-related subset of the x86 architecture instruction set. It originated as an extension of the 8086 instruction set in the form of optional floating-point coprocessors (FPU) that work in tandem with corresponding x86 CPUs. These microchips have names ending in "87". This is also known as the NPX (numeric processor extension). Like other extensions to the basic instruction set, x87 instructions are not strictly needed to construct working programs, but provide hardware and microcode implementations of common numerical tasks, allowing these tasks to be performed much faster than corresponding machine code routines can. The x87 instruction set includes instructions for basic floating-point operations such as addition, subtraction and comparison, but also for more complex numerical operations, such as the computation of the tangent function and its inverse, for example.

Most x86 processors since the Intel 80486 have had these x87 instructions implemented in the main CPU, but the term is sometimes still used to refer to that part of the instruction set. Before x87 instructions were standard in PCs, compilers or programmers had to use rather slow library calls to perform floating-point operations, a method that is still common in (low-cost) embedded systems.

== Description ==
The x87 registers form an eight-level deep non-strict stack structure ranging from ST(0) to ST(7) with registers that can be directly accessed by either operand, using an offset relative to the top, as well as pushed and popped. (This scheme may be compared to how a stack frame may be both pushed/popped and indexed.)

There are instructions to push, calculate, and pop values on top of this stack; unary operations (FSQRT, FPTAN etc.) then implicitly address the topmost ST(0), while binary operations (FADD, FMUL, FCOM, etc.) implicitly address ST(0) and ST(1). The non-strict stack model also allows binary operations to use ST(0) together with a direct memory operand or with an explicitly specified stack register, ST(x), in a role similar to a traditional accumulator (a combined destination and left operand). This can also be reversed on an instruction-by-instruction basis with ST(0) as the unmodified operand and ST(x) as the destination. Furthermore, the contents in ST(0) can be exchanged with another stack register using an instruction called FXCH ST(x).

These properties make the x87 stack usable as seven freely addressable registers plus a dedicated accumulator (or as seven independent accumulators). This is especially applicable on superscalar x86 processors (such as the Pentium of 1993 and later), where these exchange instructions (codes D9C8..D9CF_{h}) are optimized down to a zero clock penalty by using one of the integer paths for FXCH ST(x) in parallel with the FPU instruction. Despite being natural and convenient for human assembly language programmers, some compiler writers have found it complicated to construct automatic code generators that schedule x87 code effectively. Such a stack-based interface potentially can minimize the need to save scratch variables in function calls compared with a register-based interface (although, historically, design issues in the 8087 implementation limited that potential.)

The x87 provides single-precision, double-precision and 80-bit double-extended precision binary floating-point arithmetic as per the IEEE 754-1985 standard. By default, the x87 processors all use 80-bit double-extended precision internally (to allow sustained precision over many calculations, see IEEE 754 design rationale). A given sequence of arithmetic operations may thus behave slightly differently compared to a strict single-precision or double-precision IEEE 754 FPU. As this may sometimes be problematic for some semi-numerical calculations written to assume double precision for correct operation, to avoid such problems, the x87 can be configured using a special configuration/status register to automatically round to single or double precision after the basic arithmetic operations, i.e. addition, subtraction, multiplication and division, plus square root; logarithm, exponentiation, trigonometry etc. always yield double-extended (80-bit) precision. Since the introduction of SSE2, the x87 instructions are not as essential as they once were, but remain important as a high-precision scalar unit for numerical calculations sensitive to round-off error and requiring the 64-bit mantissa precision and extended range available in the 80-bit format.

=== Performance ===
Clock cycle counts for examples of typical x87 FPU instructions (only register-register versions shown here).

The A...B notation (minimum to maximum) covers timing variations dependent on transient pipeline status and the arithmetic precision chosen (32, 64 or 80 bits); it also includes variations due to numerical cases (such as the number of set bits, zero, etc.). The L → H notation depicts values corresponding to the lowest (L) and the highest (H) maximal clock frequencies that were available.

x87 implementation	FADD	FMUL	FDIV	FXCH	FCOM	FSQRT	FPTAN	FPATAN	Max clock (MHz)	Peak FMUL (millions/s)	FMUL^{§} rel. 5 MHz 8087
8087	70…100	90…145	193…203	10…15	40…50	180…186	30…540	250…800	5 → 10	0.034…0.055 → 0.100…0.111	1 → 2× as fast
80287 (original)	70…100	90…145	193…203	10…15	40…50	180…186	30…540	250…800	6 → 12	0.041…0.066 → 0.083…0.133	1.2 → 2.4×
80387 (and later 287 models)	23…34	29…57	88…91	18	24	122…129	191…497	314…487	16 → 33	0.280…0.552 → 0.580…1.1	~10 → 20×
80486 (or 80487)	8…20	16	73	4	4	83…87	200…273	218…303	16 → 50	1.0 → 3.1	~18 → 56×
Cyrix 6x86, Cyrix MII	4…7	4…6	24…34	2	4	59…60	117…129	97…161	66 → 300	11…16 → 50…75	~320 → 1400×
AMD K6 (including K6 II/III)	2	2	21…41	2	3	21…41	?	?	166 → 550	83 → 275	~1500 → 5000×
Pentium / Pentium MMX	1…3	1…3	39	1 (0*)	1…4	70	17…173	19…134	60 → 300	20…60 → 100…300	~1100 → 5400×
Pentium Pro	1…3	2…5	16…56	1 (0*)	1	28…68	?	?	150 → 200	30…75 → 40…100	~1400 → 1800×
Pentium II / III	1…3	2…5	17…38	1 (0*)	1	27…50	?	?	233 → 1400	47…116 → 280…700	~2100 → 13000×
Athlon (K7)	1…4	1…4	13…24	1 (0*)	1…2	16…35	?	?	500 → 2330	125…500 → 580…2330	~9000 → 42000×
Athlon 64 (K8)	1…4	1…4	13…24	1 (0*)	1…2	16…35	?	?	1000 → 3200	250…1000 → 800…3200	~18000 → 58000×
Pentium 4	1…5	2…7	20…43	multiple cycles	1	20…43	?	?	1300 → 3800	186…650 → 543…1900	~11000 → 34000×

* An effective zero clock delay is often possible, via superscalar execution.
^{§} The 5 MHz 8087 was the original x87 processor. Compared to typical software-implemented floating-point routines on an 8086 (without an 8087), the factors would be even larger, perhaps by another factor of 10 (i.e., a correct floating-point addition in assembly language may well consume over 1000 cycles).

== Manufacturers ==
Companies that have designed or manufactured (Note: Fabless companies design a chip and rely on a fabbed company to manufacture it, while fabbed companies can do both the design and the manufacture by themselves.) floating-point units compatible with the Intel 8087 or later models include AMD (287, 387, 486DX, 5x86, K5, K6, K7, K8), Chips and Technologies (the Super MATH coprocessors), Cyrix (the FasMath, Cx87SLC, Cx87DLC, etc., 6x86, Cyrix MII), Fujitsu (early Pentium Mobile etc.), Harris Semiconductor (manufactured 80387 and 486DX processors), IBM (various 387 and 486 designs), IDT (the WinChip, C3, C7, Nano, etc.), IIT (the 2C87, 3C87, etc.), LC Technology (the Green MATH coprocessors), National Semiconductor (the Geode GX1, Geode GXm, etc.), NexGen (the Nx587), Rise Technology (the mP6), ST Microelectronics (manufactured 486DX, 5x86, etc.), Texas Instruments (manufactured 486DX processors etc.), Transmeta (the TM5600 and TM5800), ULSI (the Math·Co coprocessors), VIA (the C3, C7, and Nano, etc.), Weitek (the 1067, 1167, 3167 and 4167), and Xtend (the 83S87SX-25 and other coprocessors).

== Architectural generations ==
=== 8087 ===
The 8087 was the first math coprocessor for 16-bit processors designed by Intel. It was released in 1980 to be paired with the Intel 8088 or 8086 microprocessors. (Intel's earlier 8231 and 8232 floating-point processors, marketed for use with the i8080 CPU, were in fact licensed versions of AMD's Am9511 and Am9512 FPUs from 1977 and 1979.)

=== 80C187 ===
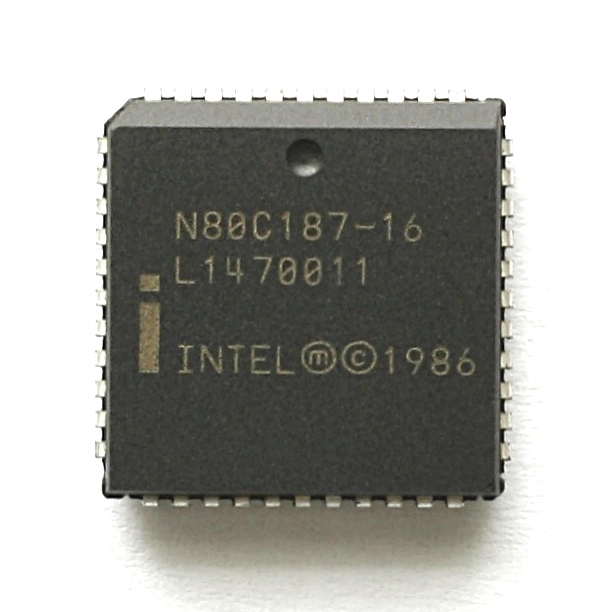
16 MHz version of the Intel 80C187

Although the original 1982 datasheet for the (NMOS based) 80188 and 80186 seem to mention specific math coprocessors, both chips were actually paired with an 8087.

However, in 1987, in order to work with the refreshed CMOS based Intel 80C186 CPU, Intel introduced the 80C187 math coprocessor. The 80C187 interface to the main processor is the same as that of the 8087, but its core is essentially that of an 80387SX and is thus fully IEEE 754-compliant and capable of executing all the 80387's extra instructions.

=== 80287 ===
The 80287 (i287), released in 1982, is the math coprocessor for the Intel 80286 series of microprocessors. Intel's models included variants with specified upper frequency limits ranging from 6 up to 12 MHz. The NMOS version were available 6, 8 and 10 MHz. The available 10 MHz Intel 80287-10 Numerics Coprocessor version was for US$250 in quantities of 100. These boxed version of 80287, 80287-8, and 80287-10 were available for US$212, US$326, and US$374, respectively. There was boxed version of 80C287A available for US$457.

Other 287 models with 387-like performance are the Intel 80C287, built using CHMOS III, and the AMD 80EC287 manufactured in AMD's CMOS process, using only fully static gates.

Later followed the i80287XL with 387SX microarchitecture with a 287 pinout, the i80287XLT, a special version intended for laptops, as well as other variants. It contains an internal 3/2 multiplier, so that motherboards that ran the coprocessor at 2/3 CPU speed could instead run the FPU at the same speed of the CPU. Both 80287XL and 80287XLT offered 50% better performance, 83% less power consumption, and additional instructions.

The 80287 works with the 80386 microprocessor and was initially the only coprocessor available for the 80386 until the introduction of the 80387 in 1987. The 80387 is strongly preferred for its higher performance and more capable instruction set.

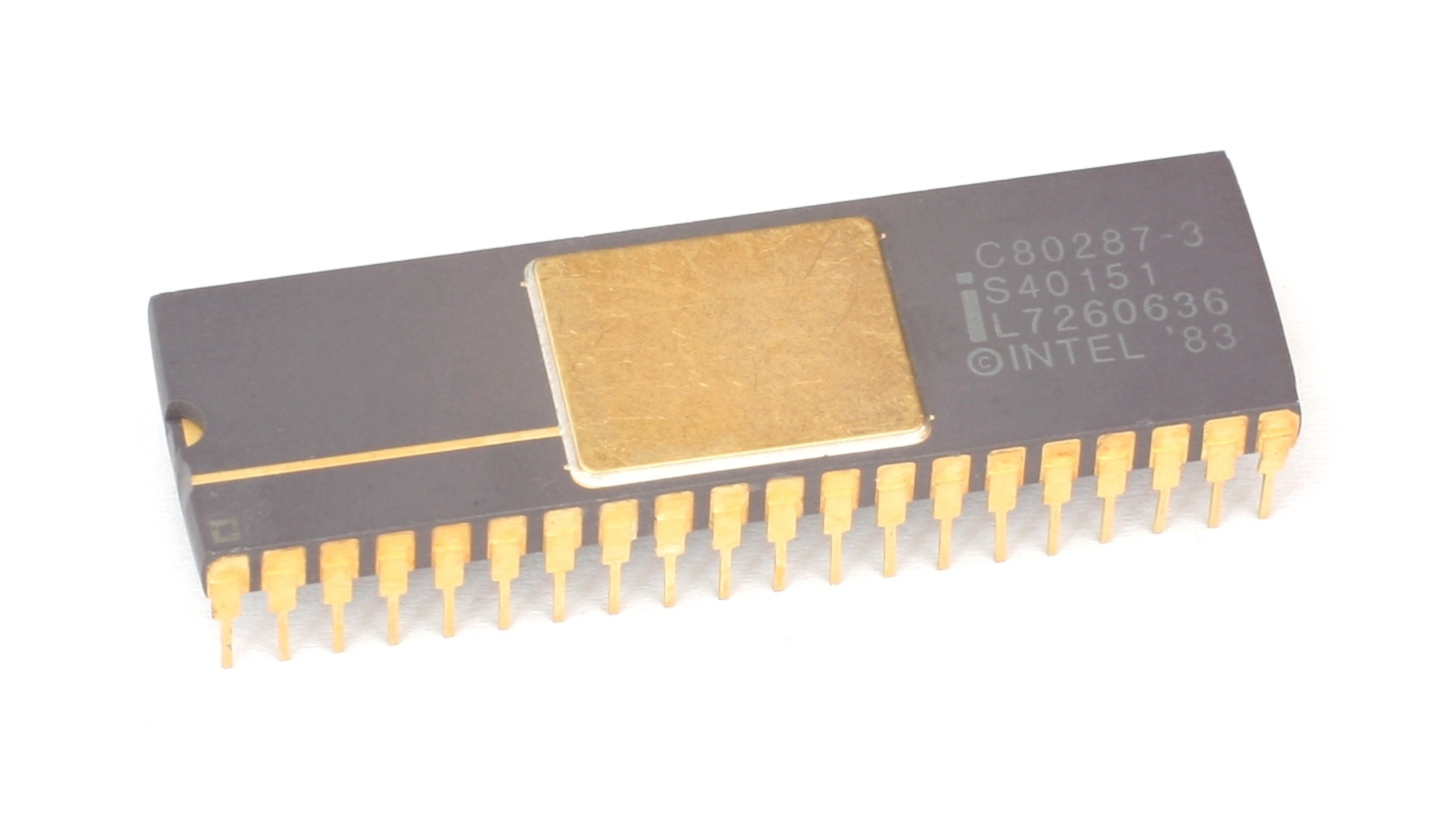
6 MHz version of the Intel 80287

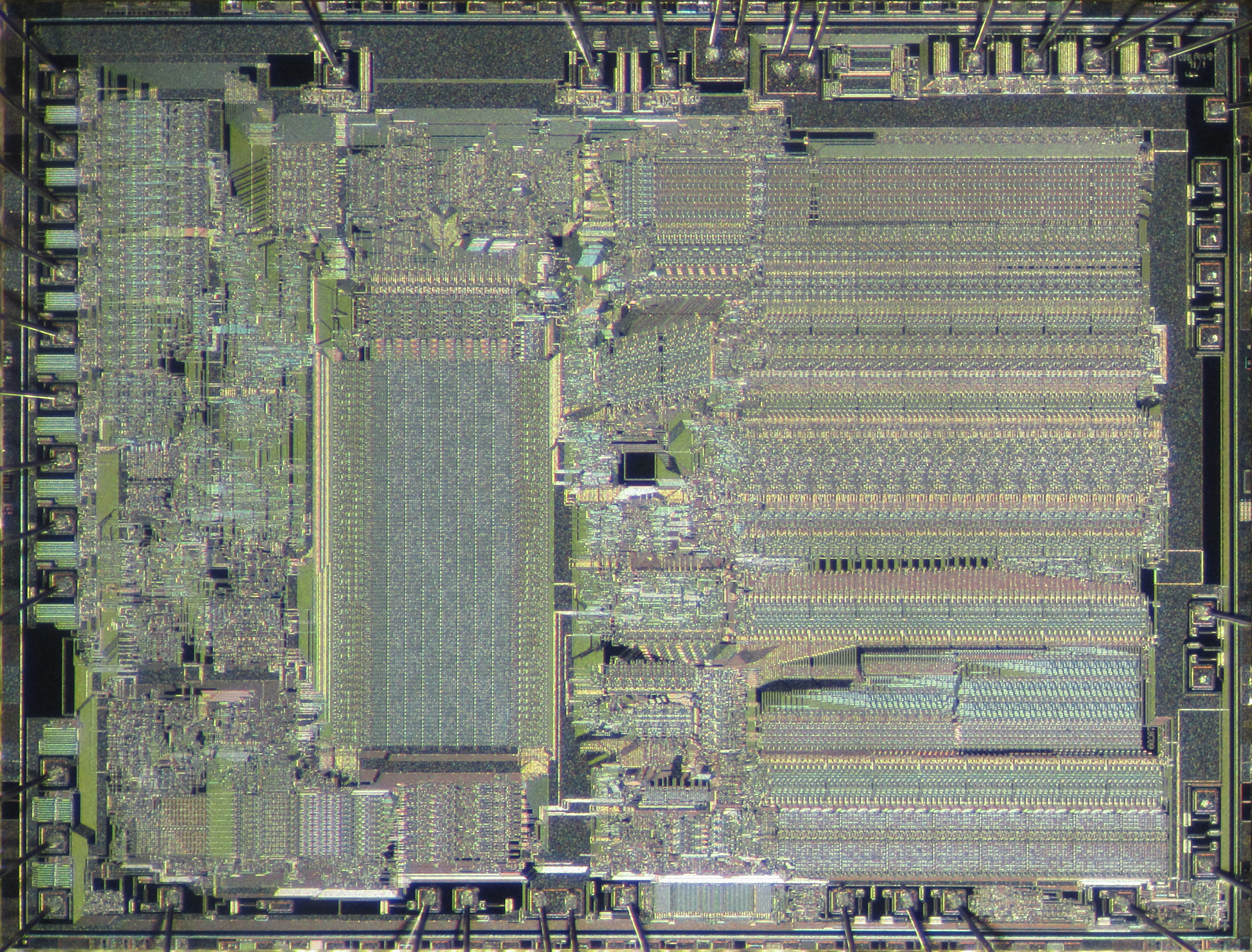
Intel 80287 die shot

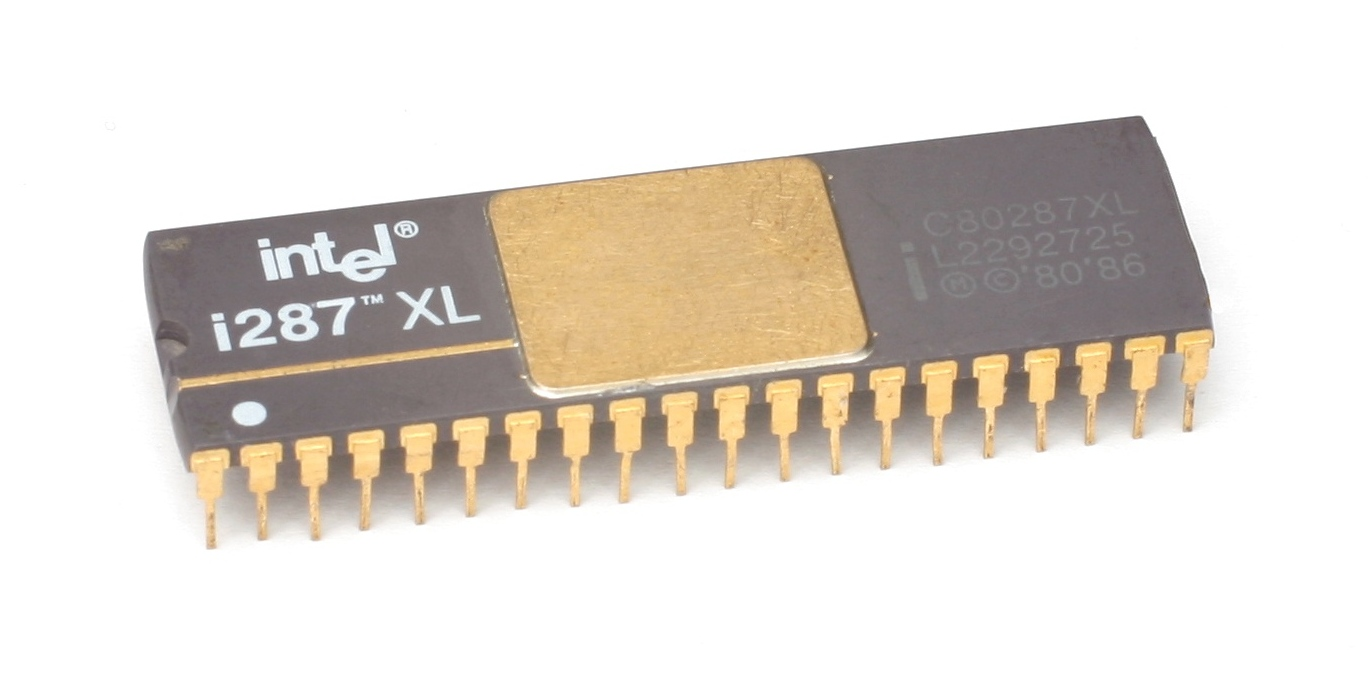
Intel 80287XL

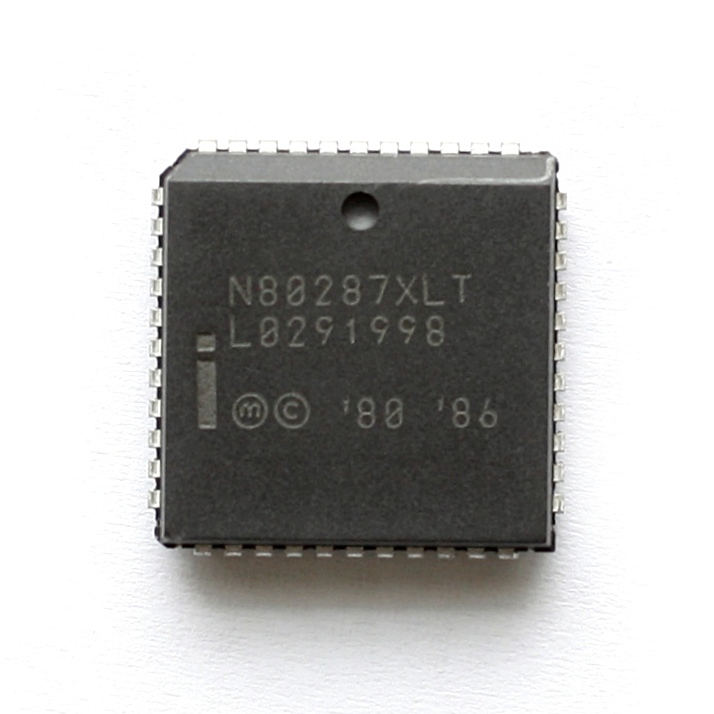
Intel 80287XLT

=== 80387 ===
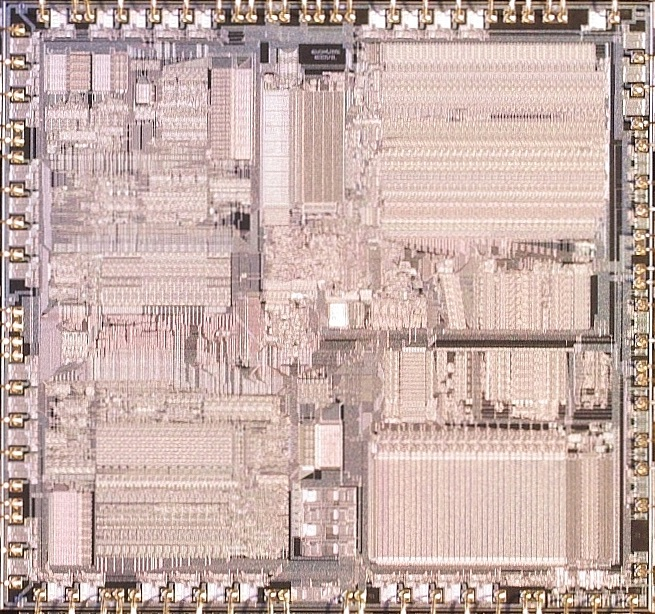
Intel 80387 CPU die image

The 80387 (387 or i387) is the first Intel coprocessor to be fully compliant with the IEEE 754-1985 standard. Released in 1987, two years after the 386 chip, the i387 includes much improved speed over Intel's previous 8087/80287 coprocessors and improved characteristics of its trigonometric functions. It was made available for US$500 in quantities of 100. Shortly afterwards, it was made available through Intel's Personal Computer Enhancement Operation for a retail market price of US$795. The 25 MHz version was available in retail channel for US$1395. The Intel M387 math coprocessor met under MIL-STD-883 Rev. C standard. This device was tested which includes temperature cycling between -55 and 125 °C, hermeticity sealed and extended burn-in. This military version operates at 16 MHz. This military version was available in 68-lead PGA and quad flatpack. This military version was available for US$1155 in 100-unit of quantities for the PGA version. The 33 MHz version of 387DX was available and it has the performance of 3.4 megawhetstones per second. The following boxed version of 16-, 20-, 25-, and 33-MHz 387DX math coprocessor were available for US$570, US$647, US$814, and US$994 respectively. The 8087 and 80287's FPTAN and FPATAN instructions are limited to an argument in the range ±π/4 (±45°), and the 8087 and 80287 have no direct instructions for the SIN and COS functions.

Without a coprocessor, the 386 normally performs floating-point arithmetic through (relatively slow) software routines, implemented at runtime through a software exception handler. When a math coprocessor is paired with the 386, the coprocessor performs the floating-point arithmetic in hardware, returning results much faster than an (emulating) software library call.

The i387 is compatible only with the standard i386 chip, which has a 32-bit processor bus. The later cost-reduced i386SX, which has a narrower 16-bit data bus, cannot interface with the i387's 32-bit bus. The i386SX requires its own coprocessor, the 80387SX, which is compatible with the SX's narrower 16-bit data bus. The 387SX coprocessor was also offered in a low-power version.

In addition, to pair with the i386SL used in laptops, Intel released the i387SL (N80387SL). Marketed as "Intel387 SL Mobile Math CoProcessor", it included power-management features which allowed it to run without significantly reducing battery life. There are two battery-saving power-down features. The first one stops the coprocessor's clock when the CPU goes into "stop clock" mode; the 387SL consumes about 25 microamperes when its clock is stopped. The second one operates automatically when the CPU is running, putting the 387SL into "idle mode" when it is not executing an instruction. When active, the 387SL typically consumes 30 percent less battery power (about 100 mA) than the 387SX. In idle mode, it consumes 4 mA, a 96 percent power reduction compared to the active mode. It works in the range of 16 to 25 MHz and does not require BIOS or hardware reconfiguration. It was initially available for US$189.

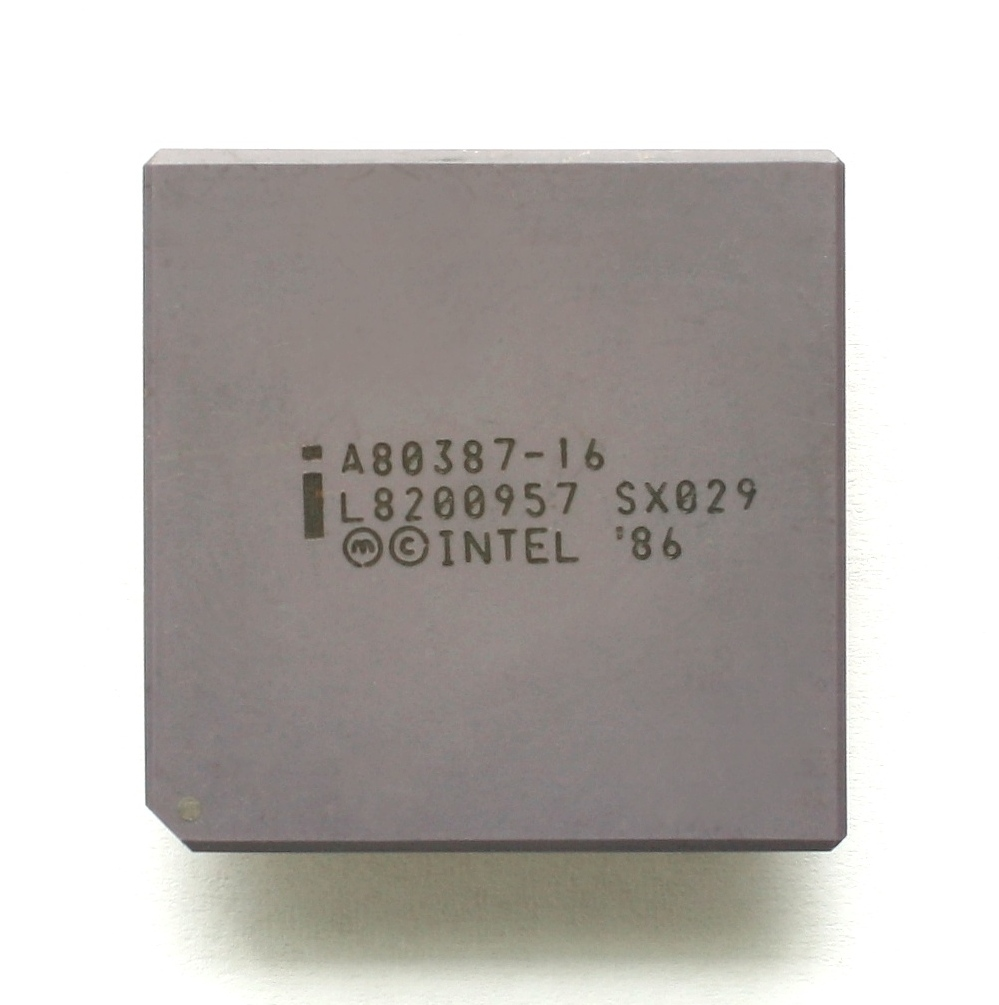
i387

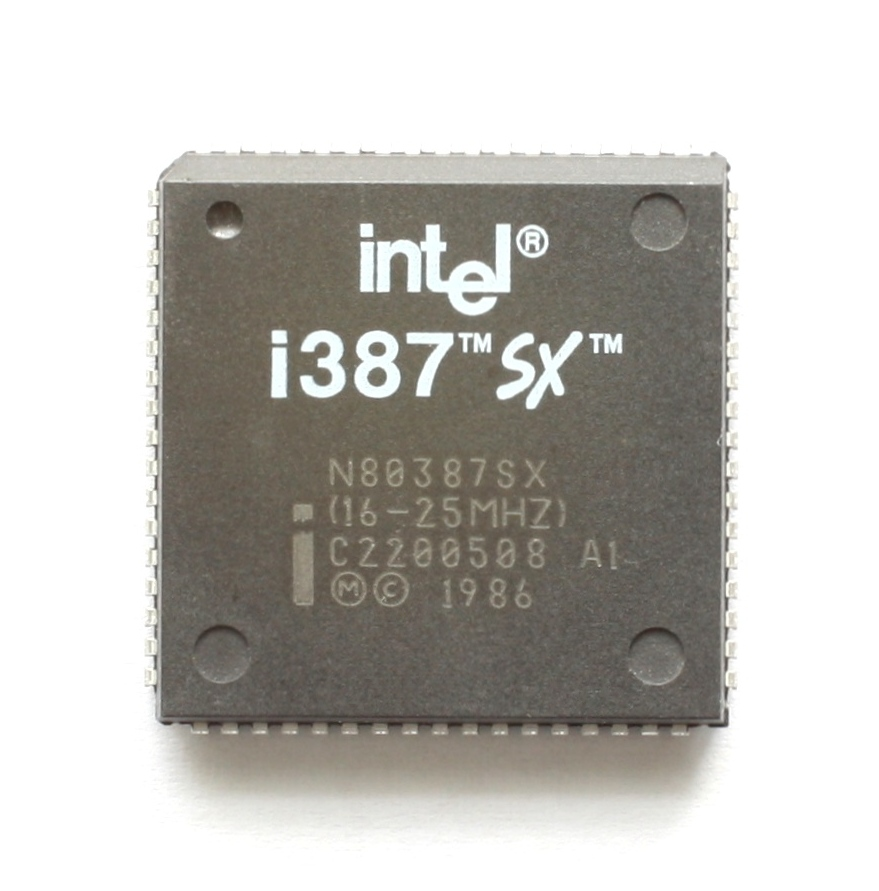
i387SX

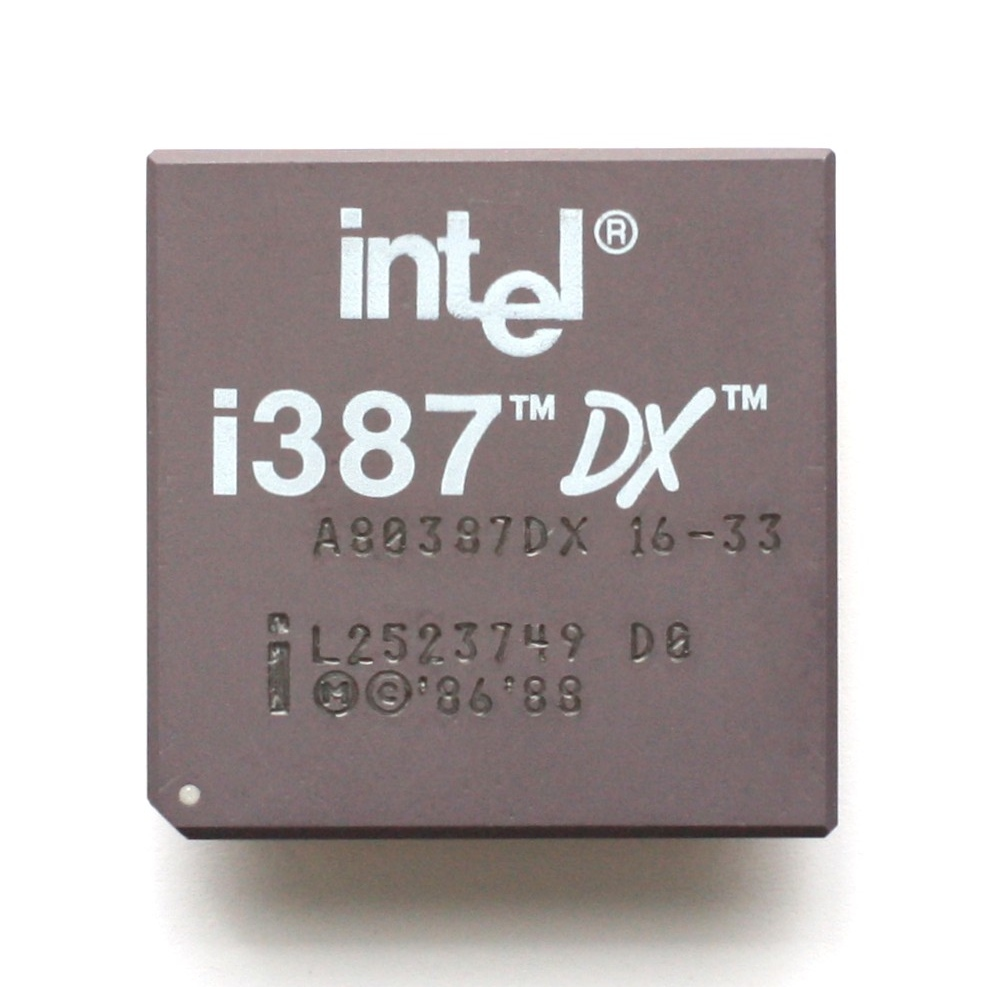
i387DX

i387 microarchitecture with 16-bit barrel shifter and CORDIC unit

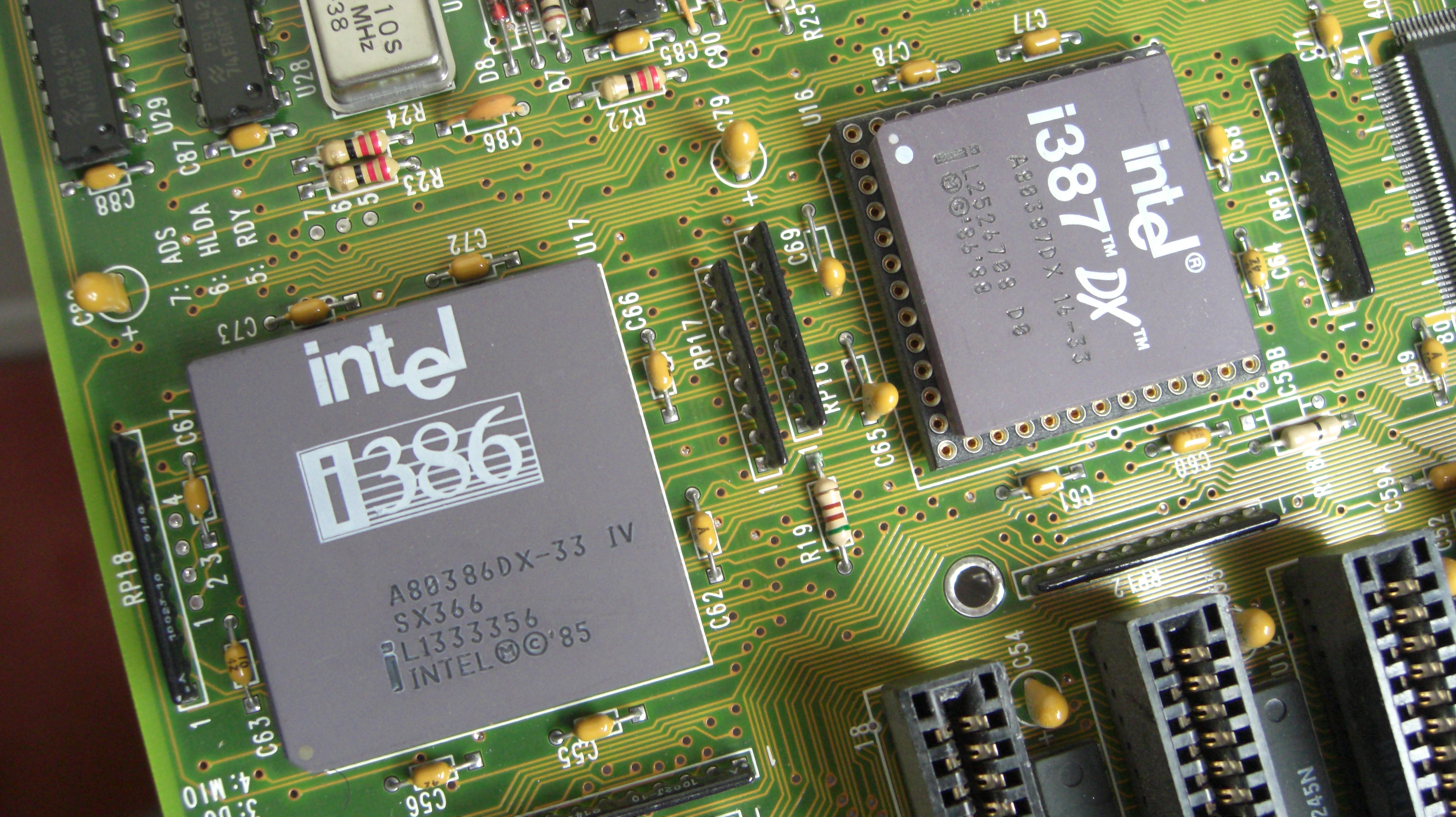
i386DX with i387DX

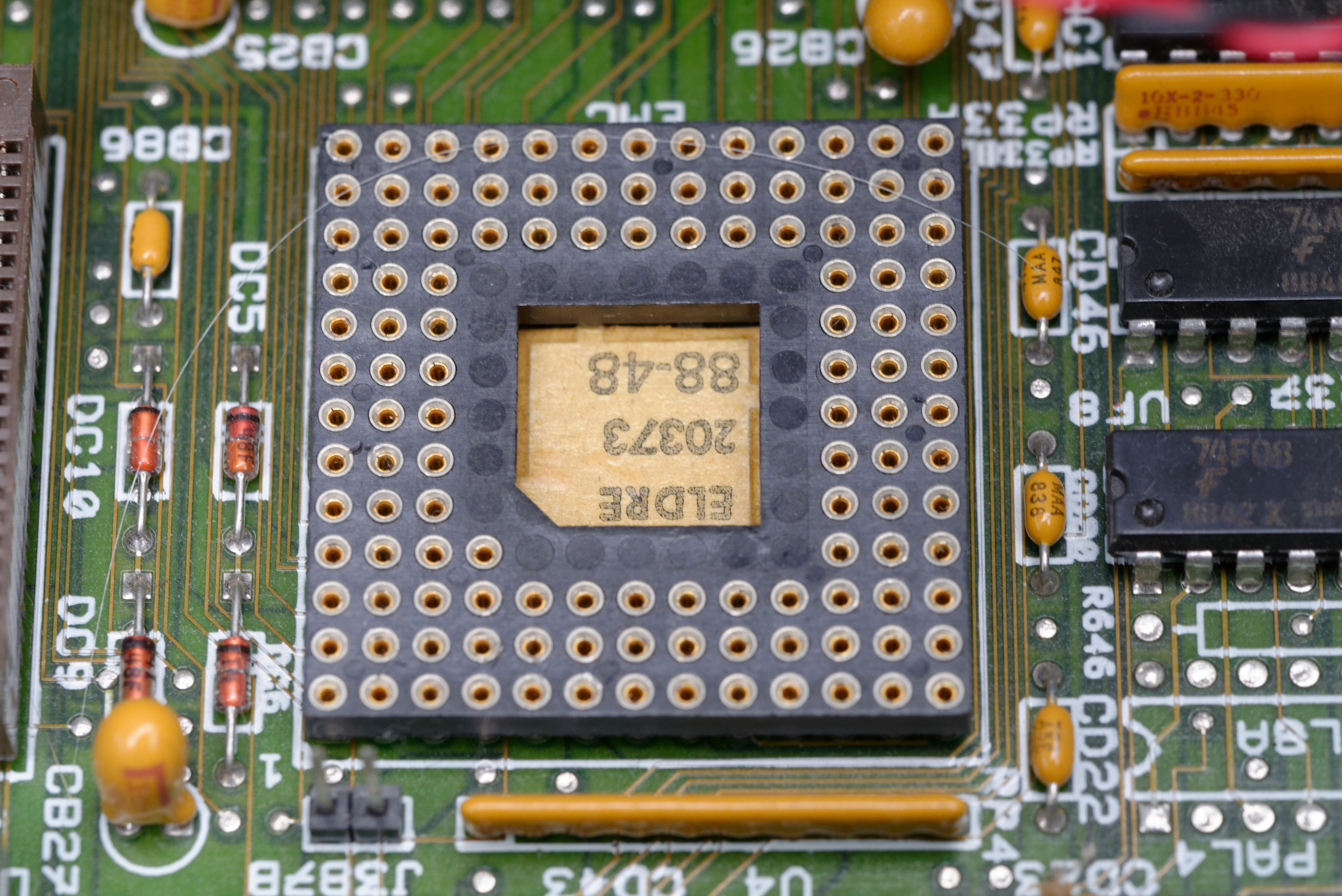
Socket for the 80387

=== 80487 ===
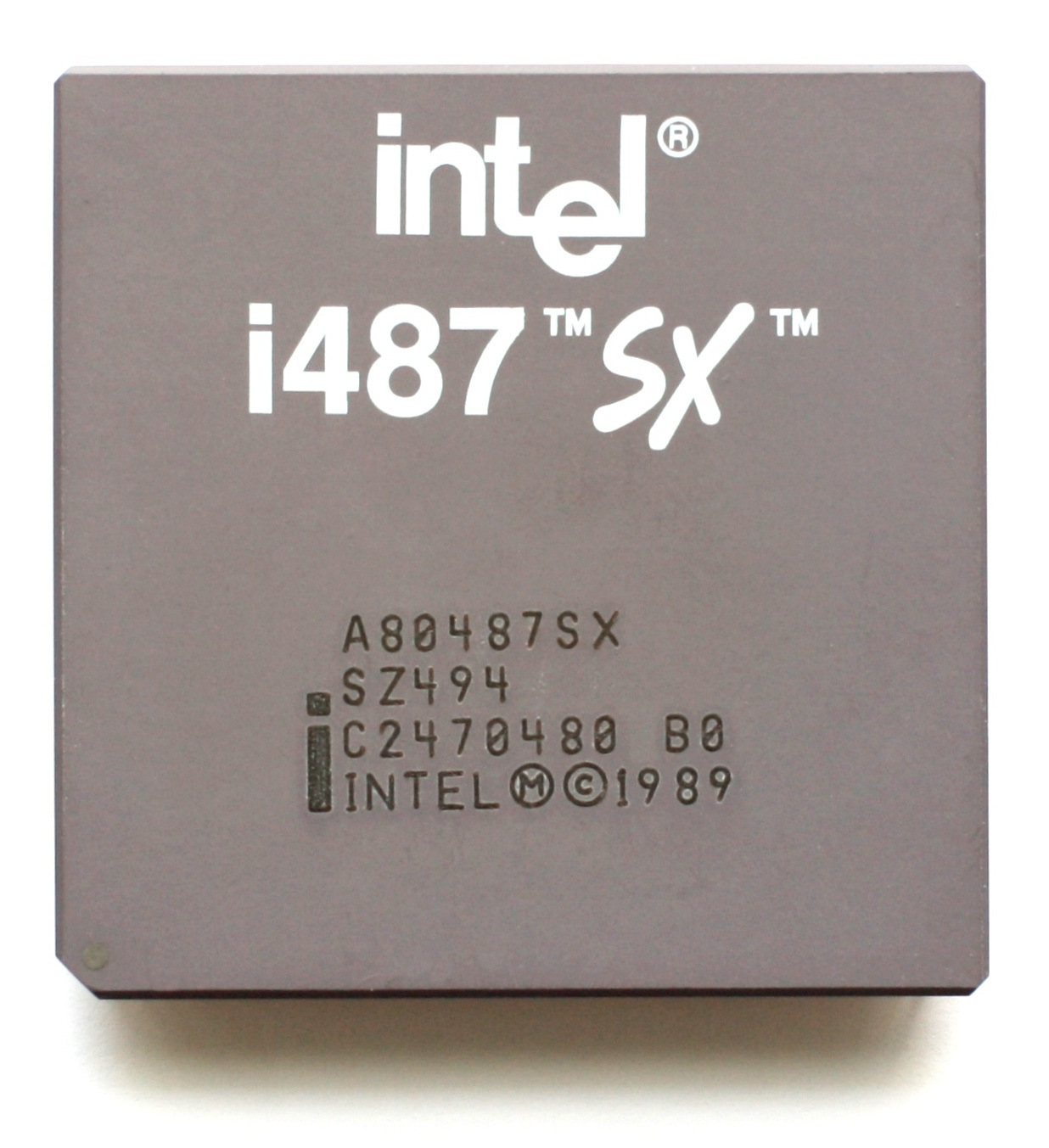
i487SX

Introduced in 1991, the i487SX (P23N) was marketed as a floating-point unit coprocessor for Intel i486SX machines. It actually contained a full-blown i486DX implementation. When installed into an i486SX system, the i487 disabled the main CPU and took over all CPU operations. The i487 manual claims that the unit would not function without an i486SX in place, but independent testing (and later Intel admission) has revealed otherwise.

The i487 used a special 169-pin socket with an unconnected (physical keying) pin to prevent insertion into the regular 168-pin 486 socket. The socket was later rebranded as Socket 1 (initially as the "OverDrive Ready" socket), when the i486 OverDrive, a processor replacement in a similar vein (but no longer marketed as an FPU upgrade), was released.

The FPU instruction set of i486DX/i487SX was not different from the 387, but integration provided a bus utilisation benefit. On-chip algorithms were also improved.

The RapidCAD, a 386-to-486 upgrade package marketed at computer-aided design use, also includes a dummy FPU (RapidCAD-2) that is installed on the 80387 socket for compatibility purposes, as the main processor (RapidCAD-1, a 486DX) includes an integrated FPU by default.

=== Nx587 ===
NexGen's Nx587 FPU for the Nx586 processor, released in 1995, was the last x87 coprocessor to be manufactured separately from the CPU.

== See also ==
- MMX
- SSE, SSE2, SSE3, SSSE3, SSE4
- AVX
- 3DNow!
- SIMD
- CORDIC routines were used by 8087 to 80487 to implement trigonometric functions.
