= Vector-06C =

1987 Russian home computer

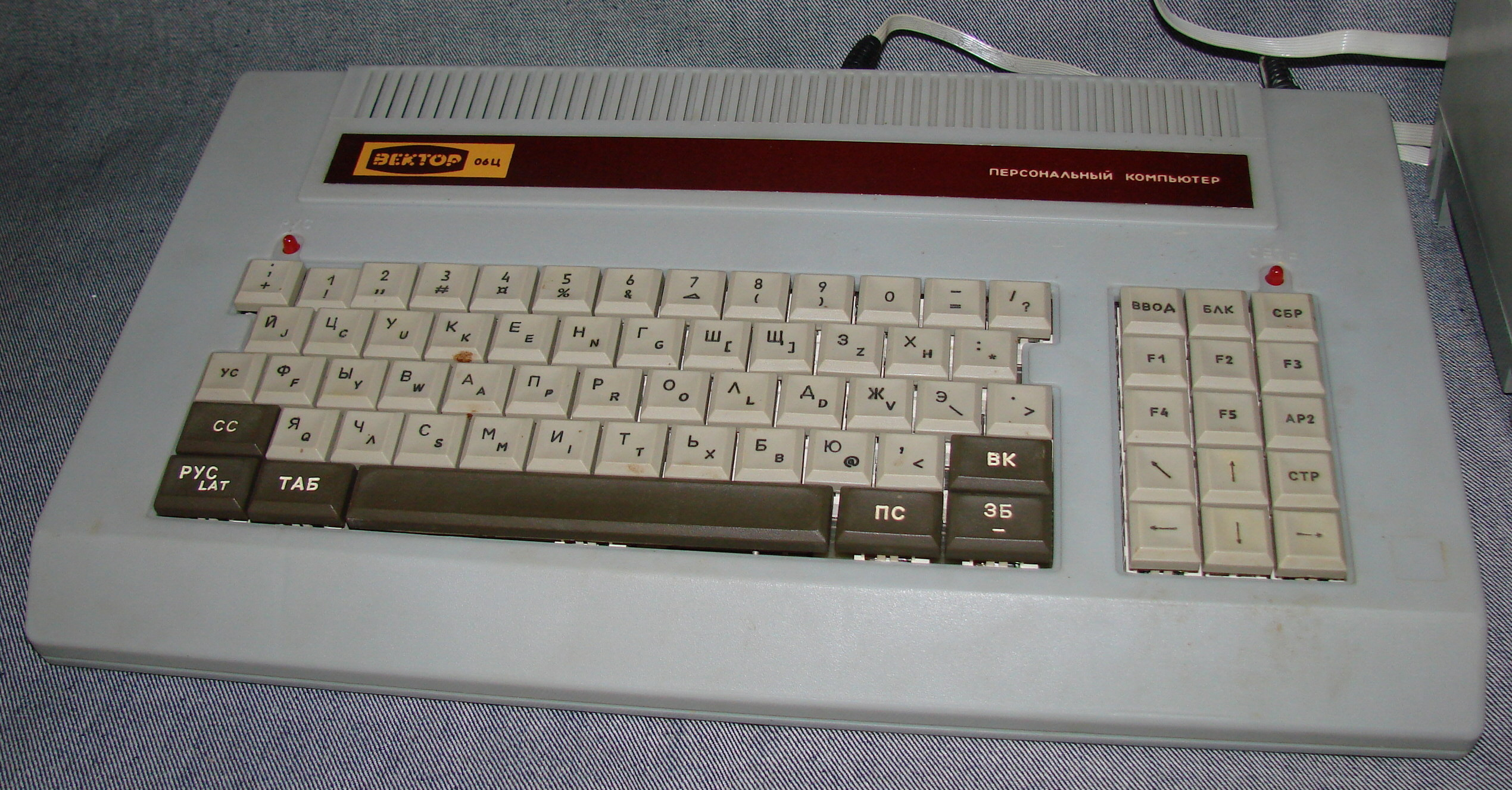
- Developer: Donat Temirazov, Alexander Sokolov
- Type: Home computer
- Released: 1987; 39 years ago
- Operating system: Tape loader or CP/M
- CPU: KR580VM80A (8080 clone) @ 3 MHz
- Memory: 64 KiB
- Display: 256×256 pixels, 16 colours out of 256-colour palette 512×256 pixels, 4 colours out of 256-colour palette 256×256 or 512×256 monochrome
- Sound: KR580VI53 (clone of Intel 8253), 3-channel sound

Vector-06C (Russian: Вектор-06Ц) is a home computer with unique graphics capabilities that was designed and mass-produced in USSR in the late 1980s.

== History ==
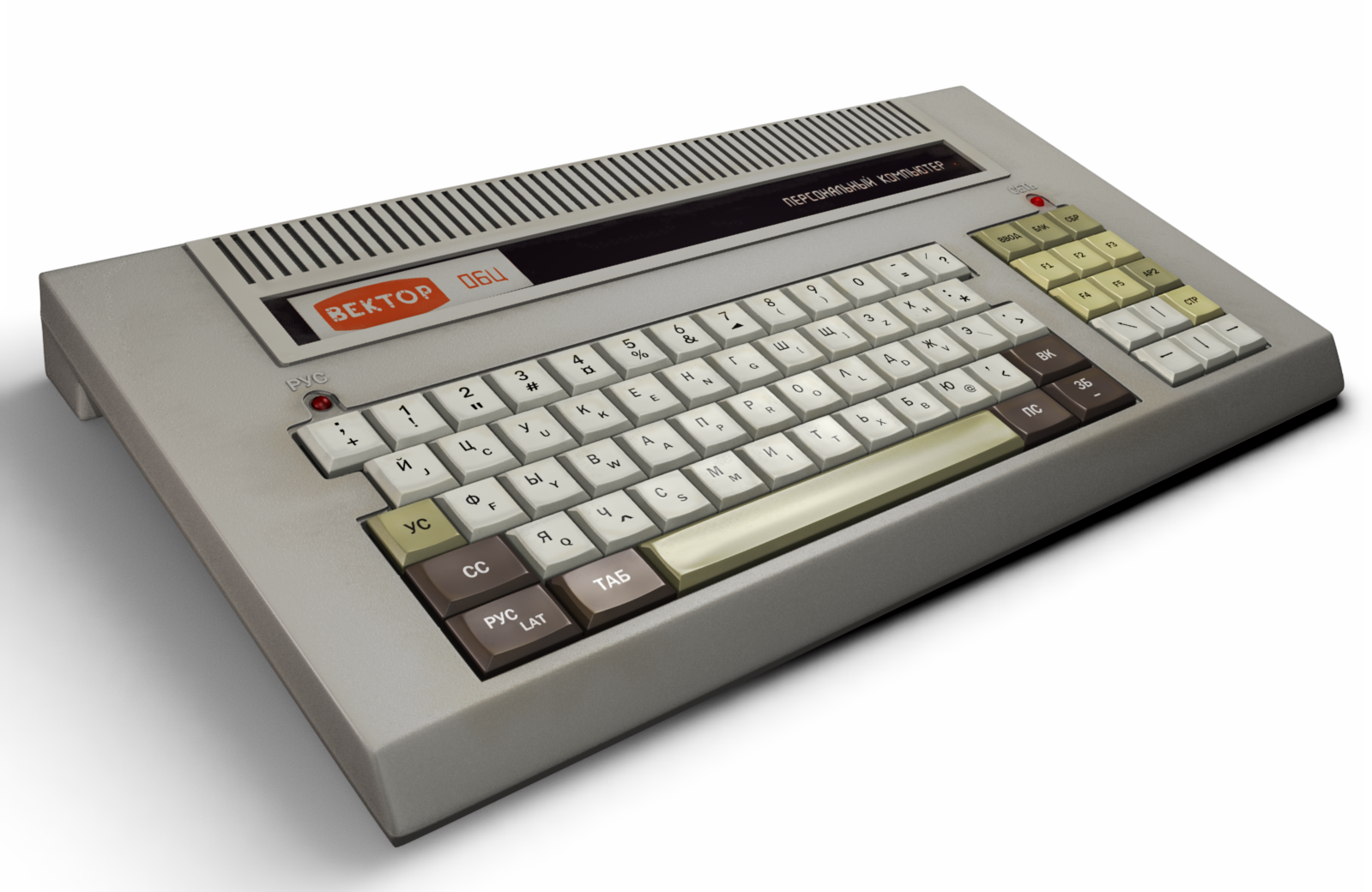
Computer model of the Vector-06C

Vector-06C was created by Soviet engineers Donat Temirazov and Alexander Sokolov from Kishinev, Moldovan SSR. On 33rd National Radio Exhibition the design was honoured with the grand prize. Shortly after that several factories started production of Vector-06C. In 1988 Vector was honoured a prize on Exhibition of Achievements of the National Economy.

There were modifications adopting Zilog Z80 CPU or the unique Soviet KR580VM1 CPU. A commercial project called Vector Turbo+ with a Z80 CPU, clock frequency increased to 6 or 12 MHz, RAM sized up to 2 MiB and a variety of other improvements was in development. However, according to the InVector e-zine, a prototype of this system never left the work bench due to economical reasons.

Vector has gradually become less popular with the increasing flow of IBM PC-compatible computers on Soviet and then CIS markets. However, Vector-06C still retains a loyal following of the few remaining fans.

== Hardware ==
CPU: KR580VM80A (8080 clone), factory overclocked to 3 MHz (standard frequency was 2.5MHz);

Busses: 8-bit data bus, 16-bit address bus;

Memory: 64 KiB RAM, up to 32 KiB can be used as video memory; 2048 bytes of ROM (512 bytes in earlier models);

=== Video ===
Vector-06C Video Memory Structure

Video system supports following modes:

- 256×256 pixels, 16 simultaneously displayed colours out of 256-colour palette
- 512×256 pixels, 4 simultaneously displayed colours out of 256-colour palette
- 256×256 or 512×256 monochrome (memory saving mode)

The frame buffer of Vector-06C is unusual for home computers. The memory is organized as 4 bit planes, palette index of each individual pixel is formed from individual bits in 4 planes. Thus the highest colour mode has 2^{4}=16 simultaneously displayed colours. The bit planes are defined as follows: a byte represents a horizontal span of 8 pixels. Next byte in video memory represents a span of 8 pixels above it and so on. Thus a bit plane in 256×256 mode can be viewed as 8-pixel wide columns, growing bottom-to-top, left-to-right; whole screen is thus covered by 32 columns.

=== Sound ===
3-channel sound system based around KR580VI53, Soviet clone of Intel 8253 timer. Third party modifications allowed use of General Instruments AY-3-8910 or Yamaha YM2149.

=== Storage ===
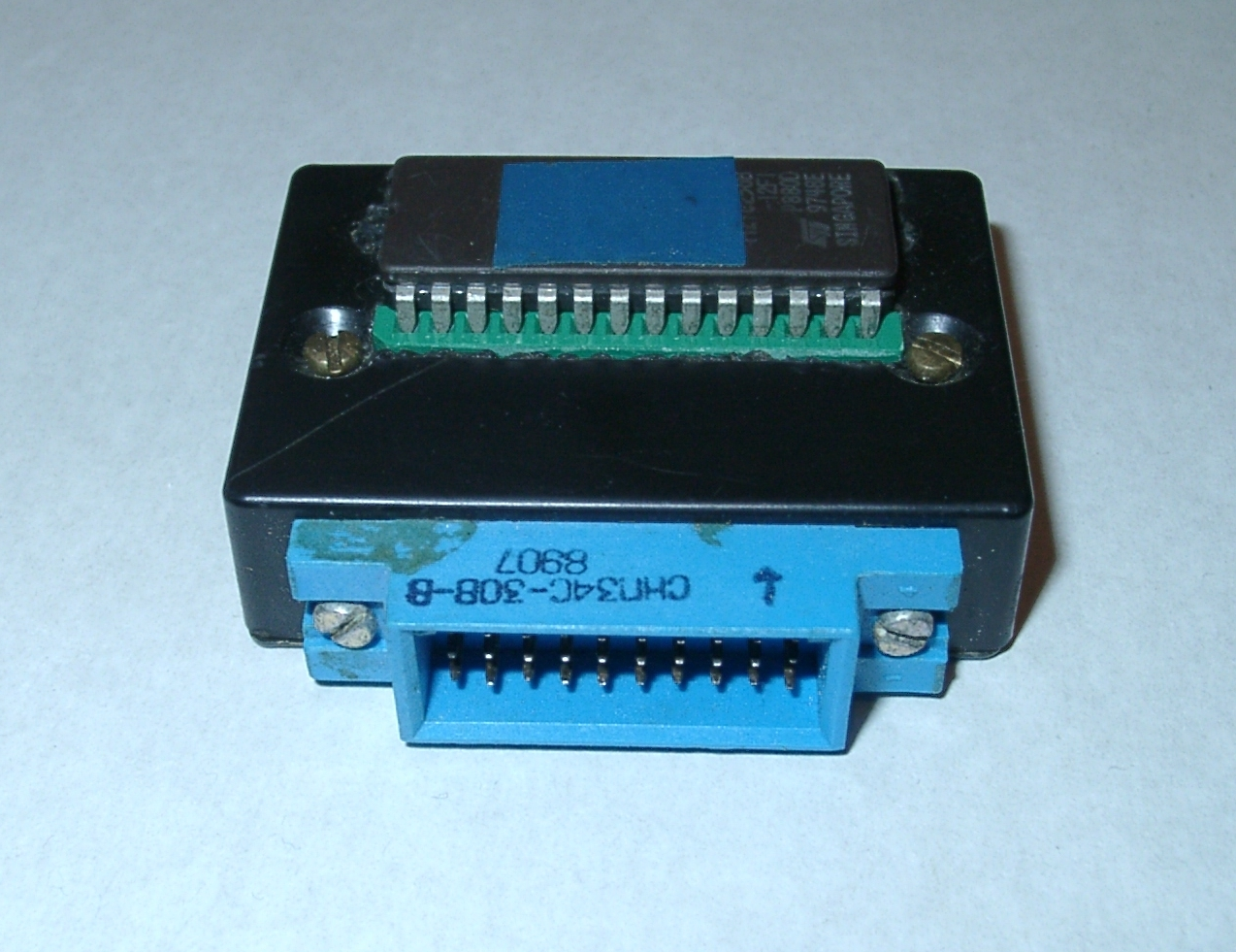
Homemade external ROM cartridge

A generic household tape recorder was used for persistent data storage. There were 2 modulation methods used, FSK and PSK. Standard 60-minute cassette could hold:

- at least 512 KiB using PSK (1500–2400 bit/s data rate)
- at least 360 KiB using FSK (1200 bit/s data rate)

FSK was primarily used in compatibility modes, which allowed reading data written on Microsha, Radio-86RK and ZX Spectrum. Native tape format used by original software is PSK.

== Software ==
Adskok by A.Z.Lebedev

The Vector-06C had no built-in software, as the tiny ROM only contained a bootloader. The computer could thus only be used with external storage. It was sold with a tape containing system utility and game programs. Third party applications could be obtained through various companies. Original software titles were games, programming languages (BASIC, Pascal, a monitor/debugger, assembler), text and graphics editors, etc.

Due to the versatility and wide hardware capabilities, the Vector could be used for education, work and entertainment. As a gaming system it surpassed most of the other Soviet computers, thanks to its unique multi-color palette and reasonably fast graphics, smoother hardware vertical scrolling, capabilities of the hardware overlay up to 4 image planes, 3-voices sound chip, a fairly large amount of RAM, far more in line with Western computers in terms of specifications. There were hundreds of games in assembler and thousands in BASIC created for Vector. Many games ported from the MSX standard, and almost without any changes (Rise Out, Putup, Alibaba, Eric, Binary Land, Pac-Man, Pairs, Stop the express, and others), and less from the ZX Spectrum and IBM PC (Exolon, Color Lines, Boulder Dash, Cybernoid, Filler, Best of the Best, and others). Many games developed specially for Vector: Ambal, Adskok, Grotohod, Polet (Flight), Planet of Birds, Sea Hunter, Death Fight, Cyber Mutant and others. Wide graphics capabilities in many cases allowed with absolute accuracy to simulate the MSX, Spectrum, IBM PC and other PCs.

With optional floppy disk extension, CP/M version 2.2 was adopted. This allowed a broad range of CP/M software to be used on Vector.

It was also possible to run some Radio-86RK, Microsha, Specialist software items. Also, a method of low-level adaptation of ZX Spectrum and MSX titles was developed and some software items were ported. In particular, Vector User magazine mentions a software package consisting of a disassembler, a processor that substitutes Z80-specific instructions that 8080 was lacking with macros and a set of macros. The package was used to port several ZX Spectrum titles, namely Chess Master, West Bank, Jumping Jack .

== User community ==
Although Vector-06C was foreshadowed by more mainstream home computers such as BK-0010, ZX Spectrum and its clones, it enjoyed a considerable loyal following of fans. Enthusiasts developed and produced software and hardware extensions for Vector. Among hardware extensions there are RAM disk, floppy and HDD controllers, sound synthesizers, real-time clocks and others. Both commercial and public developments existed. There were electronic and hardcopy publications, most notably Invector, Vector User, Coman Info. Several software contests were held among Vector users, notably DemosFan that used to take place in Saint Petersburg, Russia.
