= UT-88 =

1989 Russian home computer

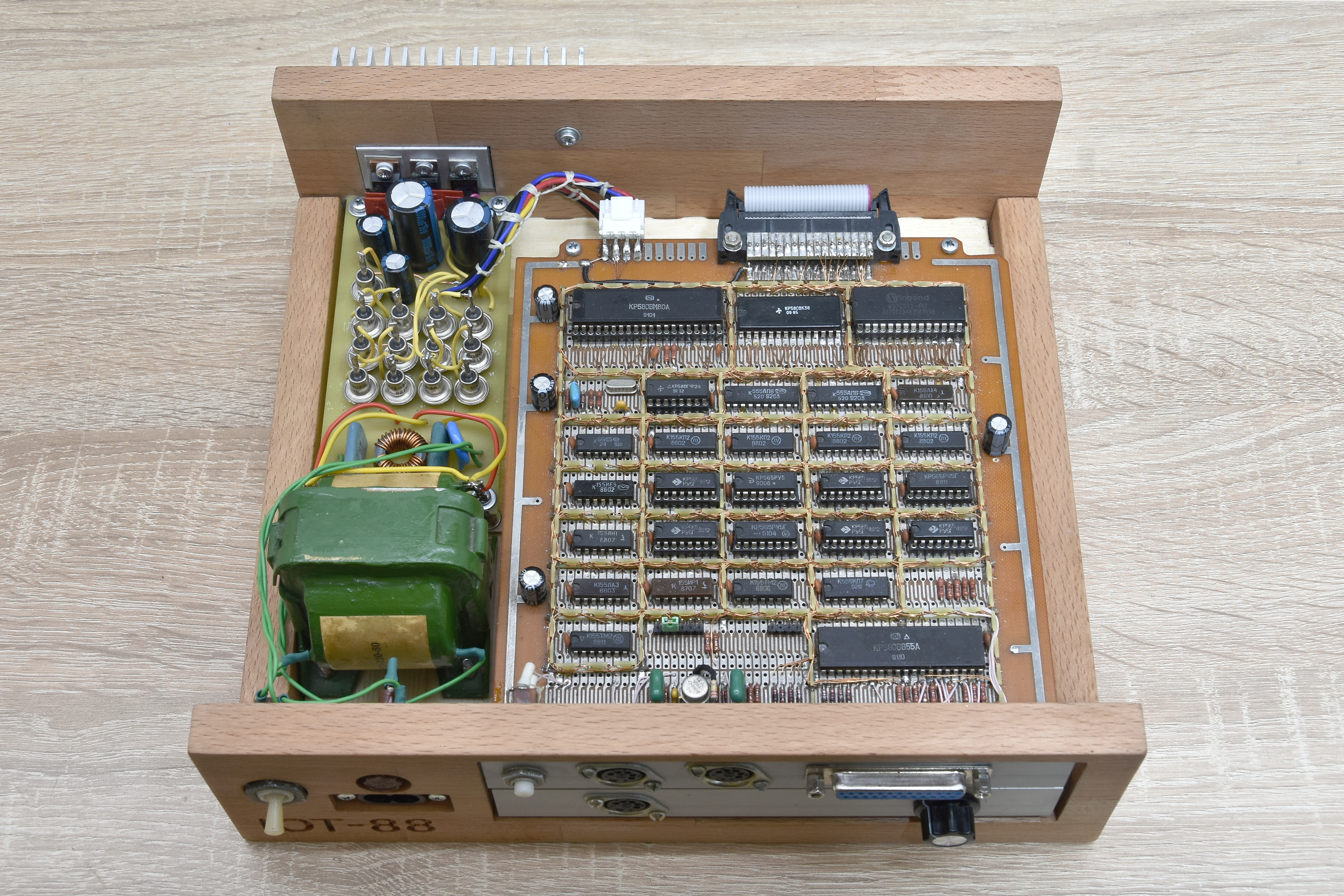
An Inside view of the UT-88

The UT-88 (Russian: ЮТ-88) is a DIY educational computer designed in the Soviet Union. Its description was published in YT dlya umelykh ruk (Young technical designer for skilled hands, Russian: ЮТ для умелых рук)—a supplement to Yunij Technik (Young technical designer, Russian: Юный техник) magazine in 1989. It was intended for building by school children of extracurricular hobby groups at Pioneers Palaces.

== Description ==
At the time of publication, there were several DIY computers: Micro-80, Radio-86RK, and Specialist. The main feature of UT-88 was the possibility to build a computer in stages while getting a workable construction at each step. This approach made it easier to build by less skilled hobbyists.

The minimal configuration of the computer includes a power supply, CPU, 1 KiB of ROM and 1 KiB of RAM, 6 seven-segment displays, a 17-key keyboard, and a tape interface. This computer can be used as a scientific calculator.

Full configuration adds a display module with a TV interface, a full keyboard, and a 64 KiB dynamic RAM module.
