= Specialist (computer) =

Home computer

- Developer: a professional technical school teacher
- Type: do-it-yourself home computer
- Released: 1987; 39 years ago
- CPU: KR580VM80A (Intel 8080A clone) @ 2 MHz
- Memory: 32 or 48 KiB
- Graphics: 384 × 256 pixels
- Input: Membrane keyboard; 72 keys

The Specialist (Ukrainian: Фахівець, Russian: Специалист) is a DIY computer designed in Soviet Union. Its description was published in Modelist-Konstructor (Russian: Моделист-Конструктор), a magazine for scale model builders in 1987. It was the first such publication in a magazine not oriented on electronics.

== Overview ==
The original construction was developed by a professional technical school teacher two years earlier. It was much more advanced than previous DIY computers, because it had a higher graphical image resolution (384x256) and a "transparent" video system, which did not slow down the CPU when both the CPU and the video system tried to access the RAM simultaneously. It gained limited popularity with hobbyists, though some factories produced DIY kits (Lik for example).

== Technical specifications ==
- CPU: KR580VM80A (Intel 8080A clone) clocked at 2 MHz.
- RAM: 32 or 48 KiB.
- ROM: 2 KiB, expandable to 12 KiB. ROM contains monitor firmware.
- Video: monochrome graphics mode. The image resolution is 384 × 256 pixels. Text can be displayed using 64 columns × 25 rows of characters. Images for the upper case Cyrillic and Latin characters in KOI-7 N2 encoding are built in the Monitor ROM.
- Storage media: cassette tape. The recording format is compatible with the one used in Radio-86RK.
- Keyboard: membrane type, 72 keys. The keyboard matrix is attached via programmable peripheral interface chip KR580VV55 (Intel 8255 clone) and scanned by CPU.
