= Juku E5101 =

Juku E5101/E5104
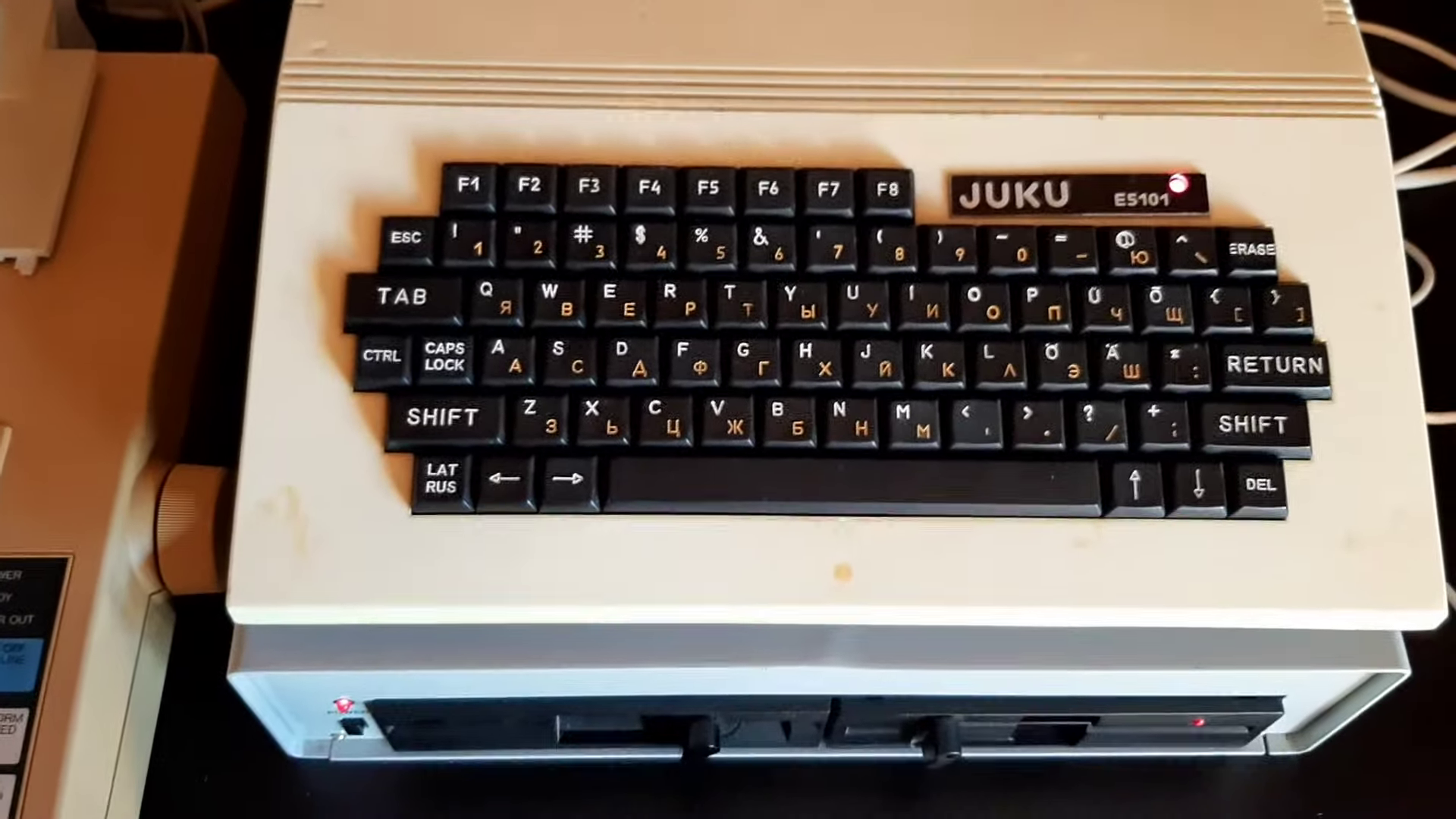
- Developer: EKTA
- Manufacturer: Estron, Baltijets
- Type: home computer
- Released: 1988; 38 years ago
- Units shipped: 3000
- Media: cassette tape, 2 × 5.25 inch floppy, 192 KiB RAM-disk
- Operating system: CP/M 2.2-based EKDOS
- CPU: KR580VM80A (Intel 8080A clone) @ 2 MHz
- Memory: 64 KiB, expandable with 32 KiB cards
- Display: monochrome CRT
- Graphics: 384 × 200 or 320 × 240 pixels
- Input: keyboard, mouse
- Power: 220 V 50 Hz, max 20 W
- Dimensions: 350 × 300 × 70mm
- Weight: up to 4.5 kg
- Marketing target: Estonian schools

Juku E5101 was a personal computer targeted at Estonian schools which was released in 1988. The computer had monochrome display, a mouse and basic LAN capabilities, it ran CP/M 2.2-based EKDOS and had a Soviet Intel 8080A clone KR580VM80A for CPU.

== History ==
Juku E5101 was developed by Special Construction Bureau of Computing Technology "EKTA" and the Institute of Cybernetics of the Academy of Sciences of Estonia, up to 100 was produced in cooperation with Estron factory in 1986-1989. The computer initially used tape recorder as storage and was reported as first computer in USSR to have mouse attached. In a multibus (Soviet I41) compatible expansion slot one could also connect 32 KiB memory expansion cards or ROM cartridges.

Juku E5104 production of which started in December 1988 was upgraded to use dual 5.25 inch diskette drive and drivers for printers. Despite relabelling it to "intellectual terminal for real-time system E5104", the label presented on main unit remained E5101.

During first two years of serial production around 2000 Jukus were produced and last batch of 500 was ordered by Estonian Ministry of Education in 1992. Altogether 3000 Jukus were produced at Narva, Baltijets plant (from Russian "Балтиец", Baltiyets), 2500 of them for school use.

In 1991 many, if not all, bigger (at least 100 pupils) Estonian schools had a computer classroom that was furnished with those machines and Epson LX800 printers.

== Legacy ==
Although the production was delayed three years and computers delivered were technologically outdated, Jukus did enable Estonia to "gain a head start in mass school computerization" by providing early access to computers and a standardized study environment. Despite conceived lack of end user skills and the shortage of computer professionals, there were schools having dedicated teachers and students themselves writing software for Jukus during extra hours at computer class, often convincing schools to lend computers home for summer vacation.

Tens of thousands of Estonian students got their first computing experience with Juku "much more, much earlier and more frequently than would have been possible otherwise".

== Gallery ==
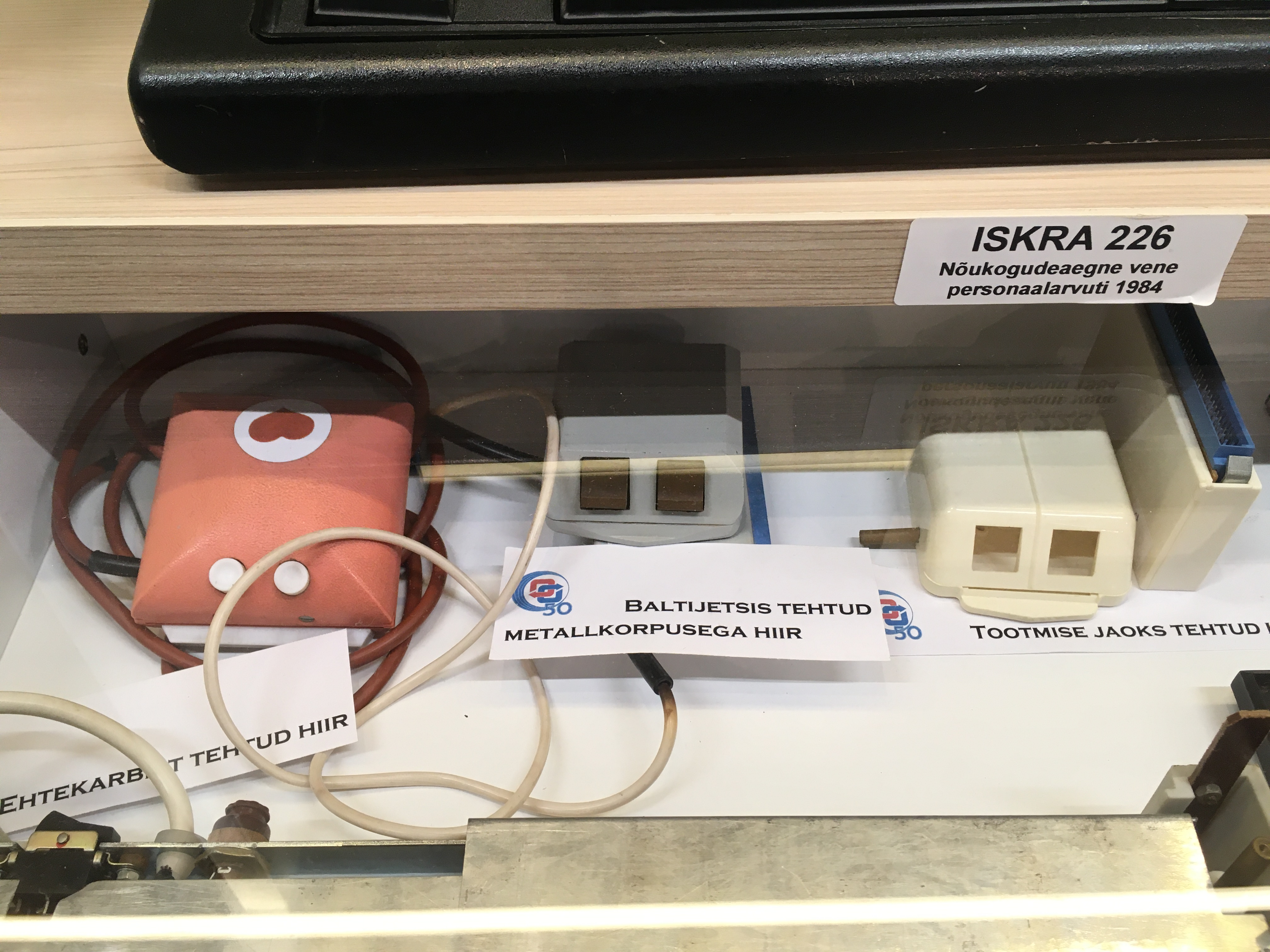
Prototypes and early versions of mice for Juku

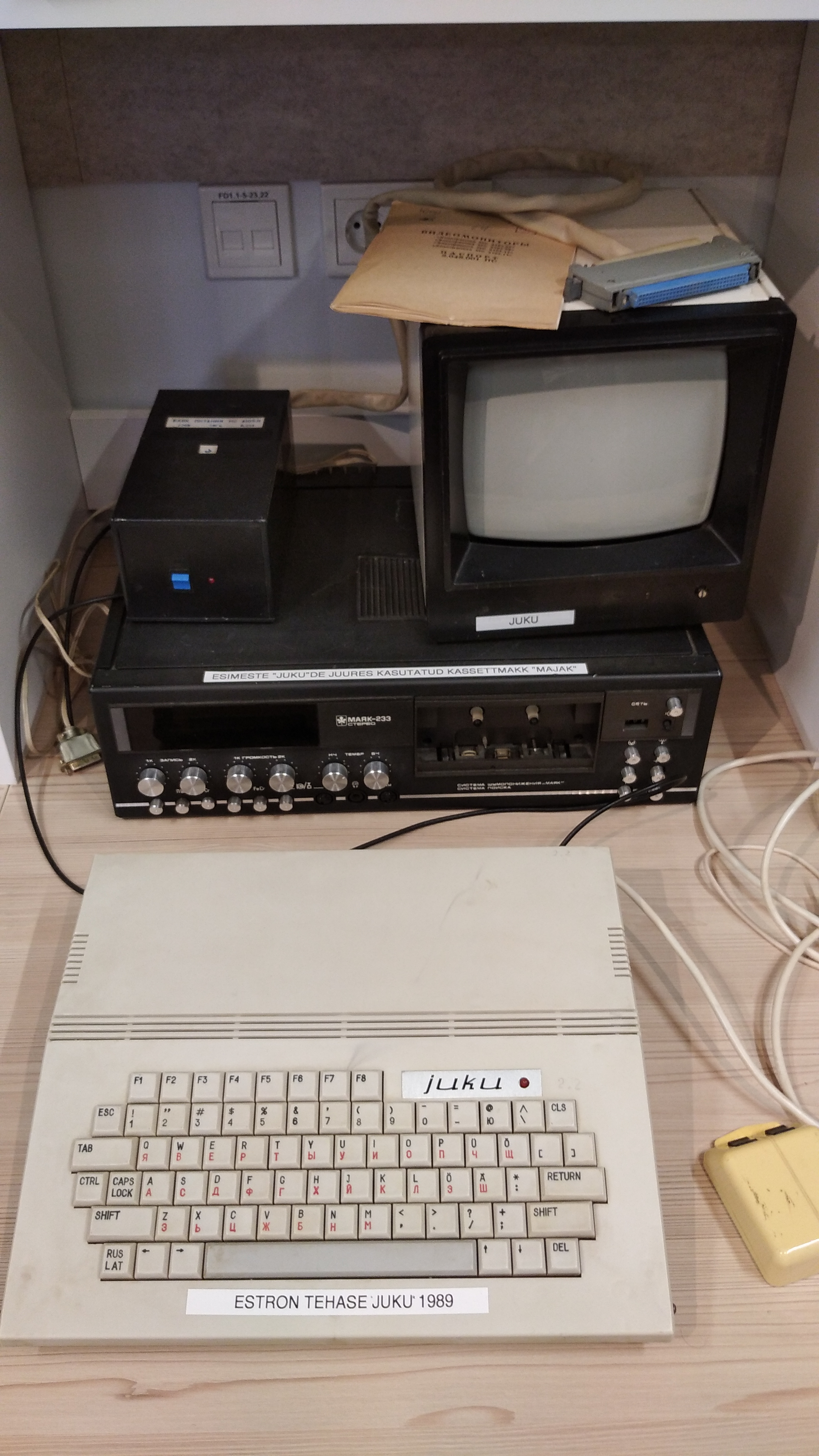
Initial version of Juku, of which mostly small test batches were produced in 1986-1989

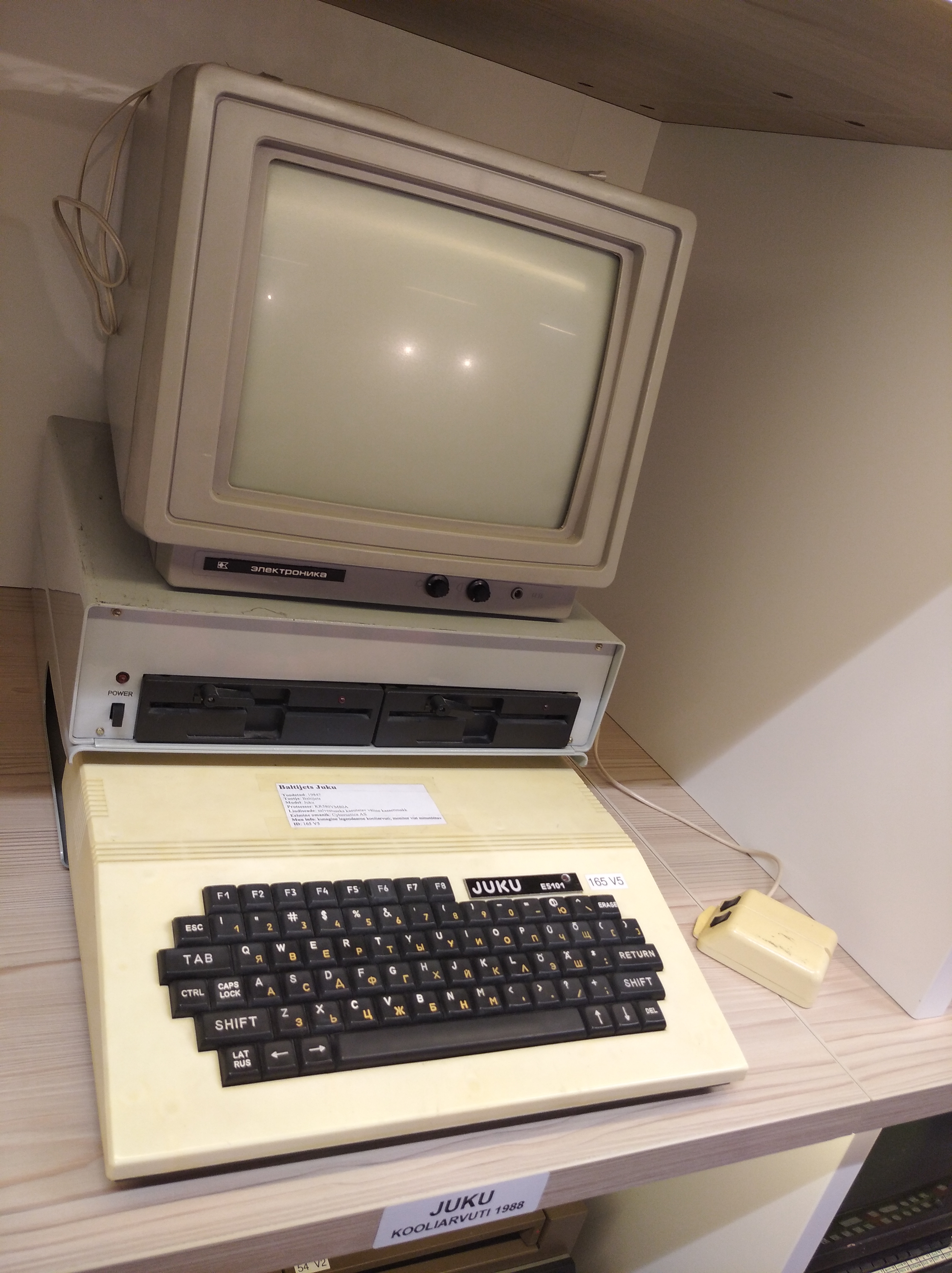
Juku E5104 with double 5.25 inch floppy drive as school computer produced in 1988-1992

== See also ==
- Iskra 1080 Tartu
- Tiigrihüpe
