= Micro-80 =

Computer in the Soviet Union

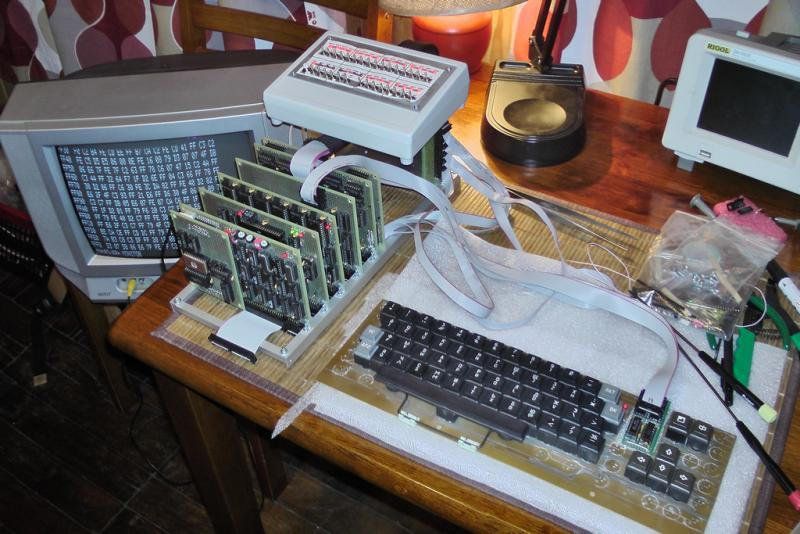
- An assembled Micro-80
- Type: Do-it-yourself home computer
- Released: 1983; 43 years ago
- CPU: KR580VM80A (a clone of the Intel 8080)
- Successor: Radio-86RK

The Micro-80 (Russian: Микро-80) was the first do-it-yourself home computer in the Soviet Union.

== Overview ==
Schematics and information were published in the local DIY electronic magazine Radio in 1983. It was complex, using an KR580VM80A-based system (a clone of the Intel 8080) which contained about 200 ICs. This system gained low popularity, but set a precedent in getting the attention of hobbyists for DIY computers, and later other DIY computers were published by Radio and other DIY magazines.

== History of creation ==
The creation of the Micro-80 prototype began in 1978, when a package from the Kiev NPO Kristall arrived at the Moscow Institute of Electronic Machine Building (MIEM) by mistake. There were microcircuits in that package. Soon, MIEM specialists figured out that this was a domestic analogue of the i8080 microprocessor and peripheral controllers and decided to create their own PC.

In 1979, the first sample of a microcomputer was launched. As in the first Western microcomputers, a terminal connected via a serial interface was used as a display device and keyboard, in this case the Videoton-340. There was also a punched tape reader FS-1500. 4 KB RAM was made on K565RU2 microcircuits with a 1K×1 organization (later the RAM was increased by another 8 KB). Initially, there was no ROM at all, and when the computer was turned on cold (as in one of the first American microcomputers Altair 8800 of 1975), it was necessary to manually enter the program for loading the block from punched tape with toggle switches. When i2708 chips (UV-ROM 1K×8) became available some time after the computer was running, they were used to store the ROM-BIOS and the monitor, eliminating the need to constantly load them from punched tape.

Popov developed a text video adapter that works on a conventional household TV and a keyboard read through the PPA KR580VV55, which eliminated the bulky industrial terminal. After a data storage system based on a cassette recorder was developed, in 1980 a prototype of a full-fledged household computer was obtained. After bringing it into a presentable form, it was shown to the Deputy Minister of the Radio Industry N.V. Gorshkov, but did not meet his understanding regarding the implementation of the development:

”Guys, stop doing bullshit. There can't be a personal computer. There can be a personal car, a personal pension, a personal dacha. Do you even know what a computer is? A computer is 100 m² of floor space, 25 service personnel and 30 liters of alcohol every month!”

== Resonance for journal publication ==
The idea to build a computer on their own interested many radio amateurs. Letters began to come to the editors of the Radio magazine with requests to simplify the design of the Micro-80 and, to facilitate assembly, develop printed circuit boards for it. Therefore, soon, already in 1986, the same authors published a much simpler Radio 86RK computer, containing only 29 microcircuits.
