= Intel 8257 =

DMA controller made by Intel

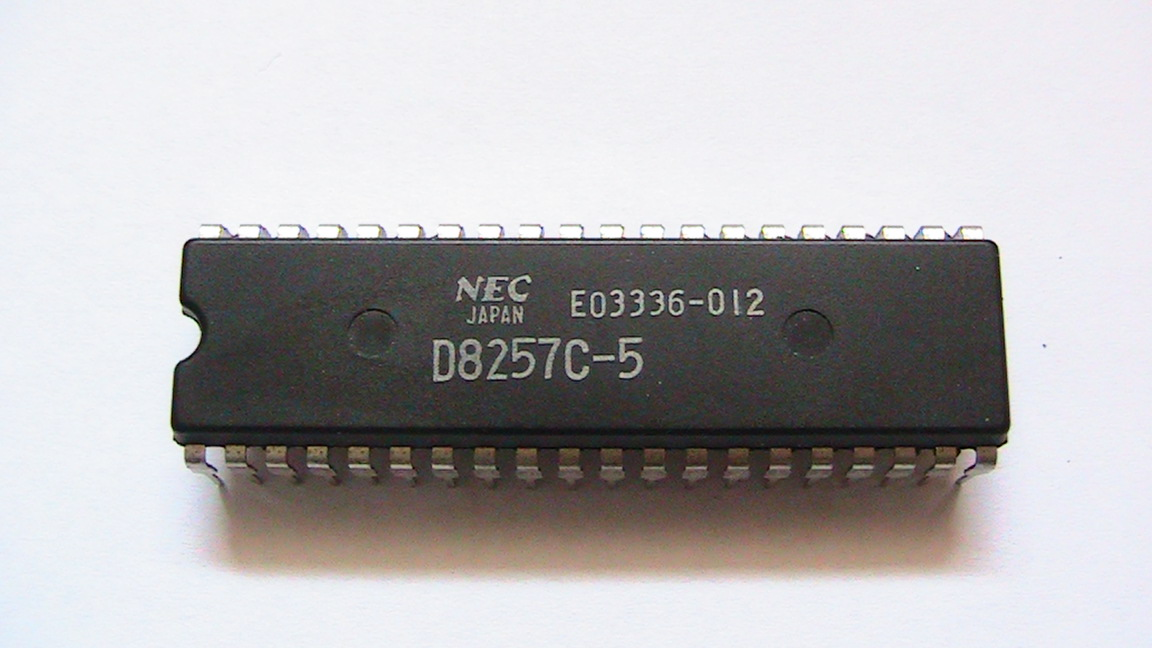
An 8257 clone by NEC (μPD8257C-5)

The Intel 8257 is a direct memory access (DMA) controller, a part of the MCS 85 microprocessor family. The chip is supplied in 40-pin DIP package.

== See also ==
- Intel 8237 - DMA Controller
