= List of Soviet computer systems =

This is the list of Soviet computer systems. The Russian abbreviation EVM (ЭВМ), present in some of the names below, means "electronic computing machine" (Russian: электронная вычислительная машина).

== List of hardware ==
The Russian abbreviation EVM (ЭВМ), present in some of the names below, means "electronic computing machine" (Russian: электронная вычислительная машина).

=== Ministry of Radio Technology ===
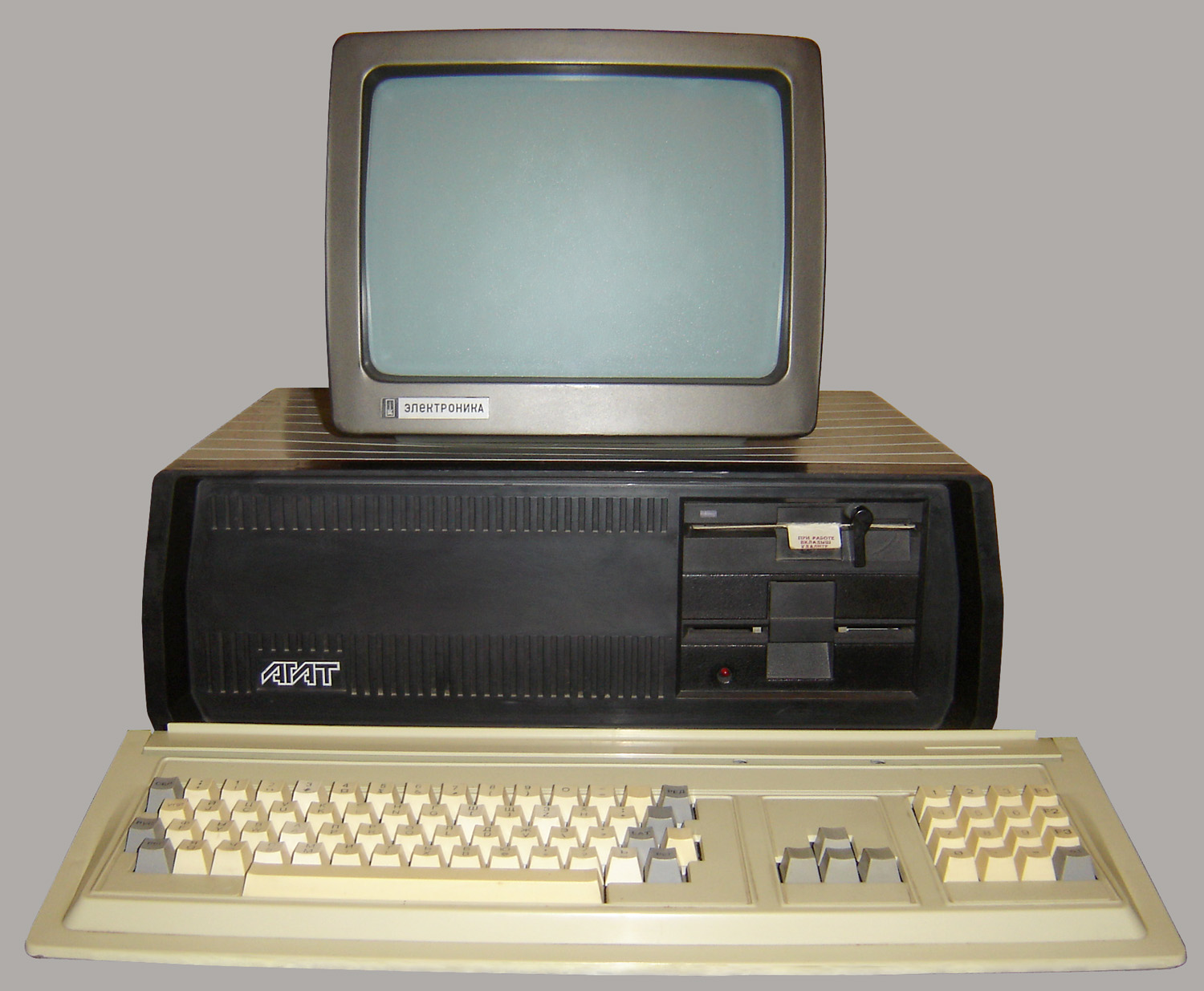
Agat-9

Computer systems from the Ministry of Radio Technology:

- Agat (Агат) — Apple II clone
- ES EVM (ЕС ЭВМ), IBM mainframe clone
- ES PEVM (ЕС ПЭВМ), IBM PC compatible
- M series — series of mainframes and mini-computers
- Minsk (Минск)
- Poisk (Поиск) — IBM PC-XT clone
- Setun (Сетунь) — unique balanced ternary computer.
- Strela (Стрела)
- Ural (Урал) — mainframe series
- Vector-06C (Вектор-06Ц)

=== Ministry of Instrument Making ===
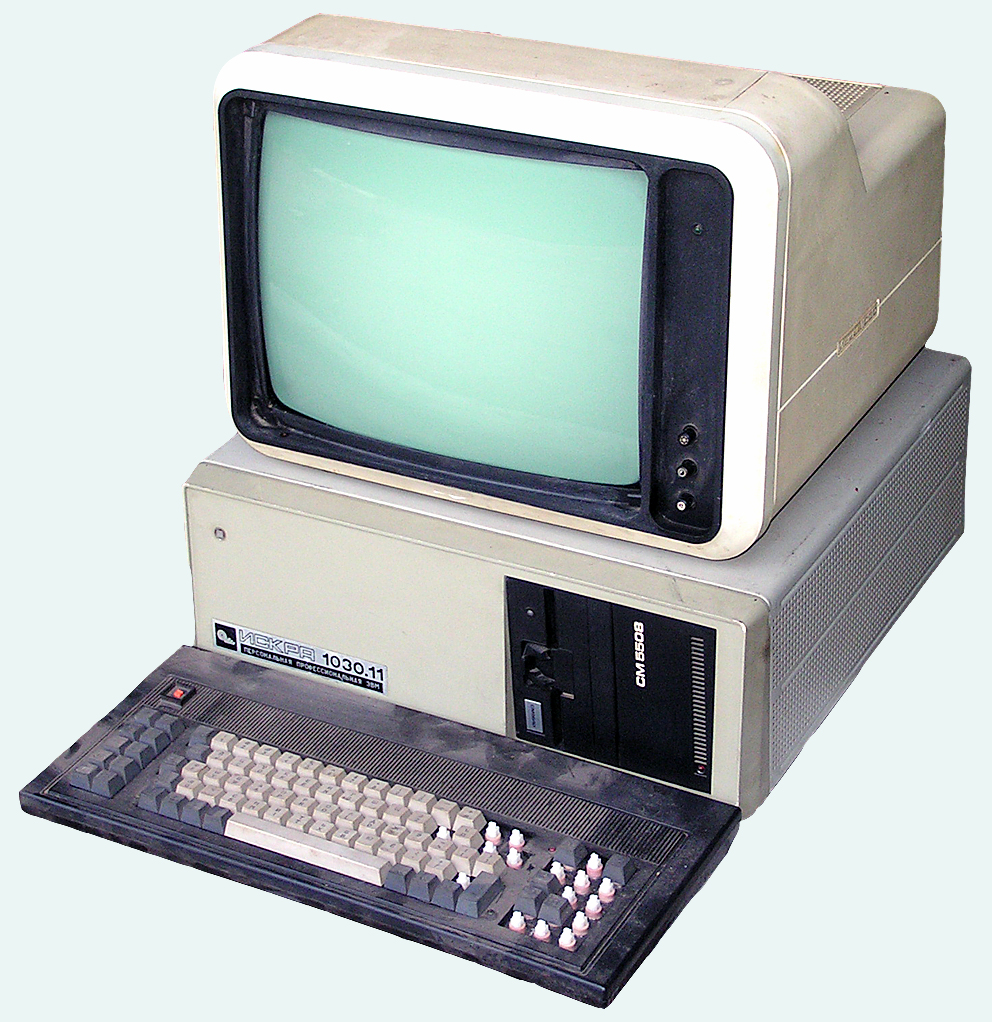
Iskra-1030

Computer systems from the Ministry of Instrument Making:

- Aragats (Арагац)
- Iskra (Искра) — common name for many computers with different architecture
  - Iskra-1030 — Intel 8086 XT clone
- KVM-1 (КВМ-1)
- SM EVM (СМ ЭВМ) — most models were PDP-11 clones, while some others were HP 2100, VAX or Intel compatible

=== Ministry of the Electronics Industry ===
Computer systems from the Ministry of Electronics Industry:

- Elektronika (Электроника) family
  - DVK family (ДВК) — PDP-11 clones
  - Elektronika BK-0010 (БК-0010, БК-0011) — LSI-11 clone home computer
  - UKNC (УКНЦ) — educational, PDP11-like
  - Elektronika 60, Elektronika 100
  - Elektronika 85 — Clone of DEC Professional (computer) 350 (F11)
  - Elektronika 85.1 — Clone of DEC Professional (computer) 380 (J11)
  - Elektronika D3-28
  - Elektronika SS BIS (Электроника СС БИС) — Cray clone

=== Soviet Academy of Sciences ===
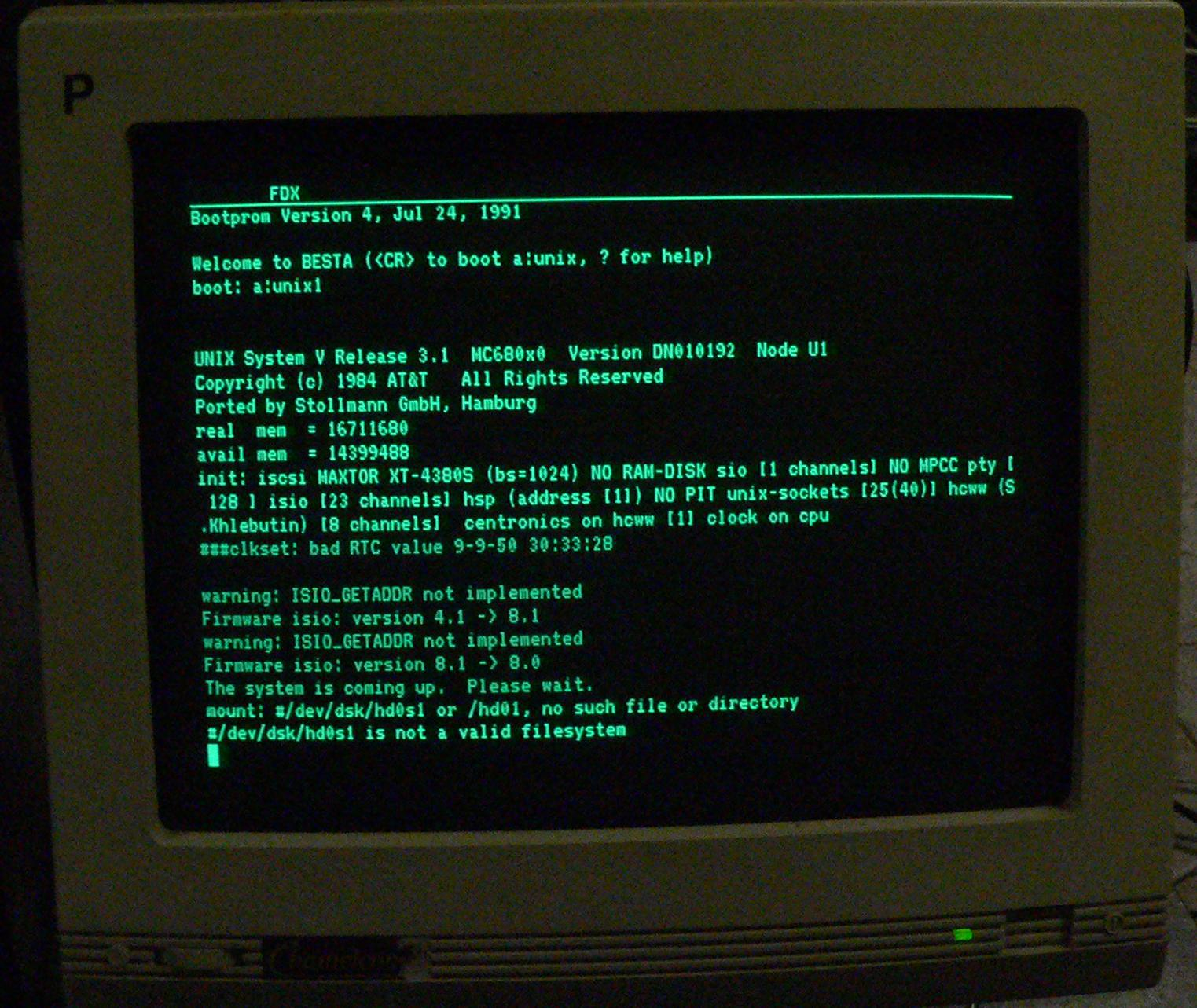
Besta running Bestix

- BESM (БЭСМ) — series of mainframes
- Besta (Беста) — Unix box, Motorola 68020-based, Sun-3 clone
- Elbrus (Эльбрус) — high-end mainframe series
- Kronos (Кронос)
- MESM (МЭСМ) — first Soviet Union computer (1950)
- M-1 — one of the earliest stored program computers (1950–1951)

=== ZX Spectrum clones ===
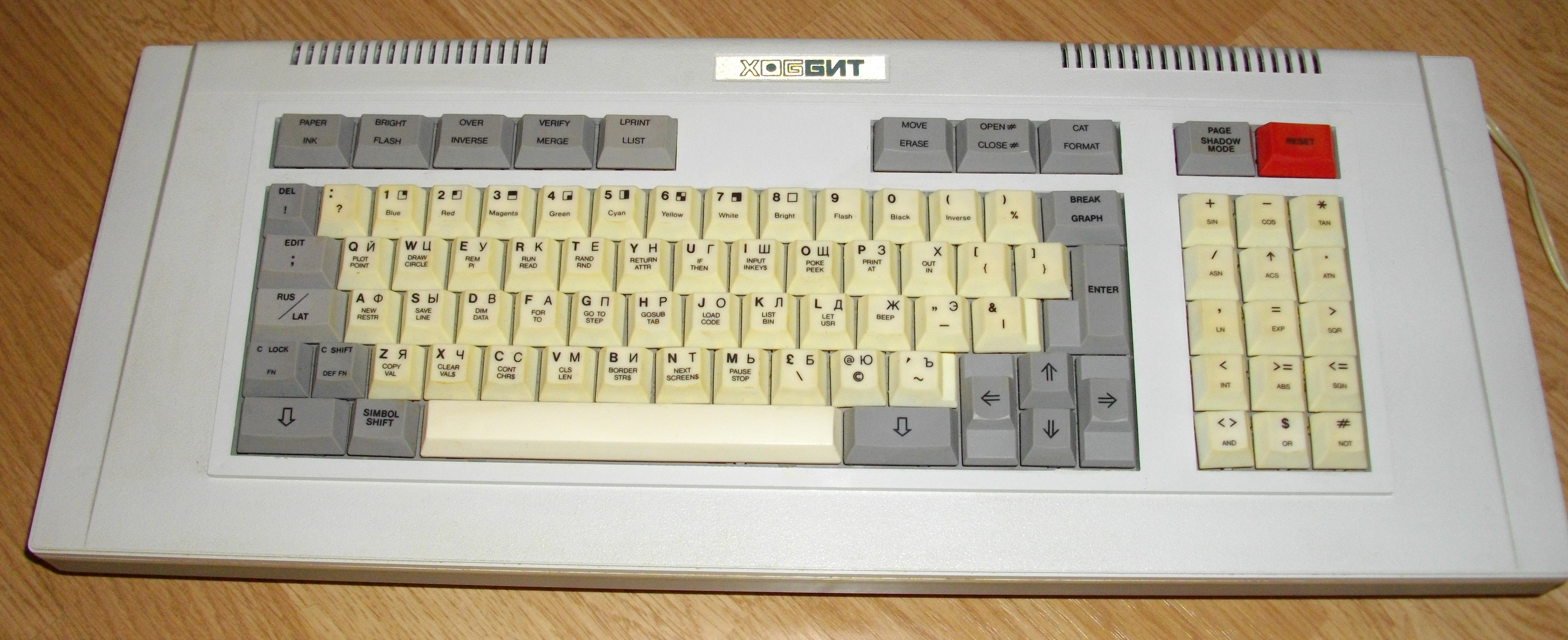
Hobbit

- ATM Turbo
- Byte
- Blic
- Dubna 48K – running at half the speed of the original
- Hobbit
- Pentagon
- Radon 'Z'
- Scorpion

=== Other ===
- 5E** (5Э**) series – military computers
  - 5E51 (5Э51)
  - 5E53 (5Э53)
  - 5E76 (5Э76) – IBM/360 clone, military version
  - 5E92 (5Э92)
  - 5E92b (5Э92б)
- A series — ES EVM-compatible military computers
- Argon — a series of military real-time computers
- AS-6 (АС-6) – multiprocessor computing complex, name is Russian abbreviation for "Connection Equipment – 6"
- Dnepr (Днепр)
- GVS-100 (ГВС-100, Гибридная Вичислителная Система) – Hybrid Computer System
- Irisha (Ириша)
- Juku (Юку) — Estonian school computer
- Kiev (Киев)
- Korvet (Корвет)
- Krista (Криста)
- Micro-80 (Микро-80) — experimental PC, based on 8080-compatible processor
- Microsha (Микроша) — modification of Radio-86RK
- MIR, МИР (uk:ЕОМ "МИР-1", uk:ЕОМ "МИР-2")
- Nairi (Наири)
- Orion-128 (Орион-128)
- Promin (Проминь)
- PS-2000, PS-3000 – multiprocessor supercomputers in the 1980s
- Razdan (Раздан)
- Radon — real-time computer, designed for anti-aircraft defense
- Radio-86RK — simplified and modified version of Micro-80
- Sneg (Снег)
- Specialist (Специалист)
- SVS
- TsUM-1 (ЦУМ-1)
- TIA-MC-1 An arcade system
- UM (УМ)
- UT-88
- Vesna and Sneg — early mainframes

== List of operating systems ==
- For Kronos
  - Kronos
- For BESM
  - D-68 (Д-68, Диспетчер-68, Dispatcher-68)
  - DISPAK ("Диспетчер Пакетов," Dispatcher of the Packets)
  - DUBNA ("ДУБНА")
- For ES EVM
  - DOS/ES ("Disk Operation system for ES EVM")
  - OS/ES ("Disk Operation system for ES EVM")
- For SM EVM
  - RAFOS (РАФОС), FOBOS (ФОБОС) and FODOS (ФОДОС) — RT-11 clones
  - OSRV (ОСРВ) — RSX-11M clone, one of the most popular Soviet multi-user systems
  - DEMOS — BSD-based Unix-like; later was ported to x86 and some other architectures
  - INMOS (ИНМОС, Инструментальная мобильная операционная система)
- For 8-bit microcomputers
  - MicroDOS (МикроДОС) — CP/M 2.2 clone
- For ZX Spectrum clones
  - iS-DOS, TASiS
  - DNA-OS
- For different platforms
  - MISS (Multipurpose Interactive timeSharing System) – ES EVM ES1010, ES EVM ES1045, D3-28M, PC-compatible, etc.
- MOS (operating system) – a Soviet clone of Unix in the 1980s

== See also ==
- History of computing in the Soviet Union
- List of Soviet microprocessors
- List of Russian IT developers
- List of Russian microprocessors
- Internet in Russia
