= Photon (arcade cabinet) =

Soviet arcade cabinet

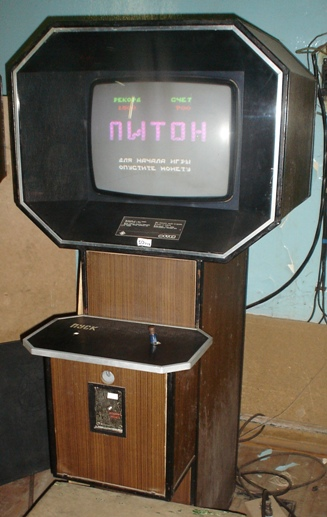
Photo of the "Photon" gaming machine with the game "Python".

Photon (Russian: Фотон) is a Soviet arcade cabinet produced between the late 1980s and the early 1990s in Penza.

== Production ==
The Photon arcade cabinet was produced in the late 1980s to early 1990s by the eponymous cooperative in Penza. Components were purchased from the plants of Voronezh, Saransk and Nizhny Novgorod. Machines were purchased from the manufacturer "Union" and the Ministry of Culture. The volume of production of automatic machines was up to 150 units per month.

== Games ==
The Photon machine with a PC8000 (Russian: ПК8000) card has three games loaded on it. The game variants of the machine differ by a sign with instructions depending on the installed game.

- Питон (Python)
- Клад / Лабиринт (Klad / Labyrinth, Treasure / Labyrinth)
- Тетрис (Tetris)

Versions of the games "Labyrinth" and "Treasure" also exist for the ordinary PC8000. The versions differ due to the lack of a coin acceptor and a time counter.

The following sets of games are known for the ZX Spectrum-compatible machine:

- Бродяга (Brodjaga, Inspector Gadget and the Circus of Fear)
- Чёрный корабль (Czernyj Korabl, Black Beard)
- Повар / Собрать Буран / Агропром (Povar / Sobrat' Buran / Agroprom, Cookie / Jetpack / Pssst)

== Technical specifications ==
Made on the basis of a slightly modified Soviet PC8000 consumer computer. The modification entails replacing the ROM chips with the BASIC interpreter with the ROM with the game program. Also, there is no keyboard and piezo emitter mounted on the computer board for audio playback. Instead, the sound output is connected to a tape recorder. The joystick is connected to the standard connector of the joystick.

Also known is a later version of the automaton, Foton-IK02, where the ZX Spectrum-compatible board is used. Compared to the PC8000 mainboard, its graphics capabilities are weaker, but faster.

== Emulation ==
In 2009, enthusiasts dumped a ROM from one of the games for the machine (Tetris). Support for the machine with a PC8000 board and the first game for it was added to the MAME emulator in version 0.133u1 in August 2009. The next version (0.134, September of the same year) adds support for a machine with a ZX Spectrum-compatible card.

== See also ==
- TIA-MC-1
- List of Soviet computer systems
