= Elektronika =

Russian electronic company

Elektronika (Russian: Электроника, "Electronics"; also Romanized Electronika, Electronica), is the brand name used for many different electronic products built by factories belonging to the Soviet Ministry of Electronic Industry, including calculators, electronic watches, portable games, and radios. Many Elektronika designs were the result of efforts by Soviet engineers, who were working for the Soviet military–industrial complex but were challenged with producing consumer goods that were in great shortage in the Soviet Union. The brand is still in use in Belarus by Technochas.

== Calculators ==
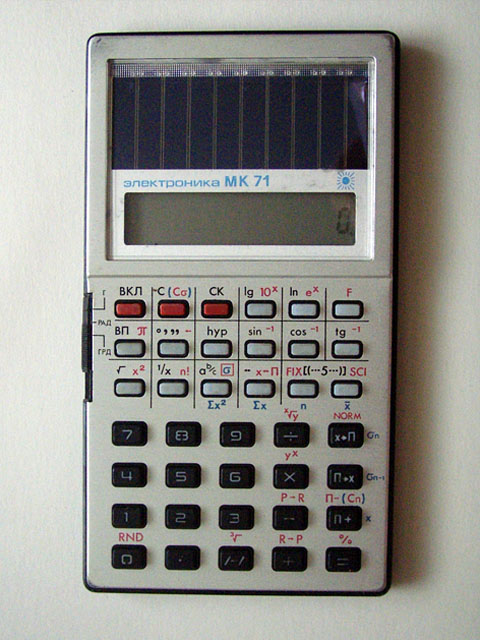
Elektronika MK-71

Most notable is a line of calculators, which started production in 1968. The Elektronika calculators were produced in a variety of sizes and function sets, ranging from large, bulky four-function calculators to smaller models designed for use in schools operating on a special, safer 42V standard (like the MK-SCH-2). As time progressed, Elektronika calculators were produced that supported more advanced calculations, with some of the most recent models even offering full programmability and functionality similar to today's American-designed graphing calculators.

The Elektronika brand is now used by Novosibirsk RPN programmable calculators Elektronika MK-152 (ru:Электроника МК-152) and Elektronika MK-161 (ru:Электроника МК-161).

== Computers ==
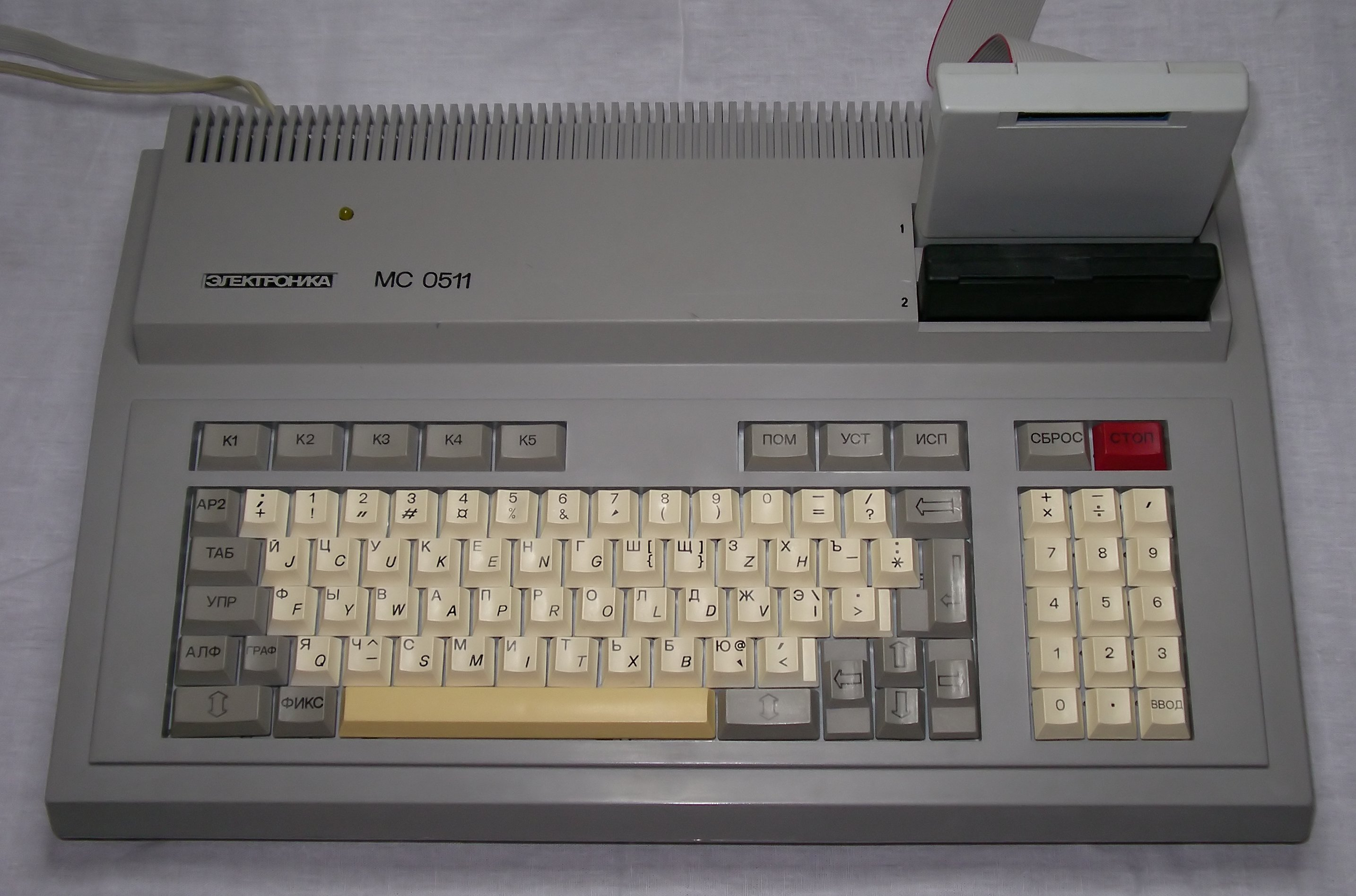
UKNC MS 0511 personal computer

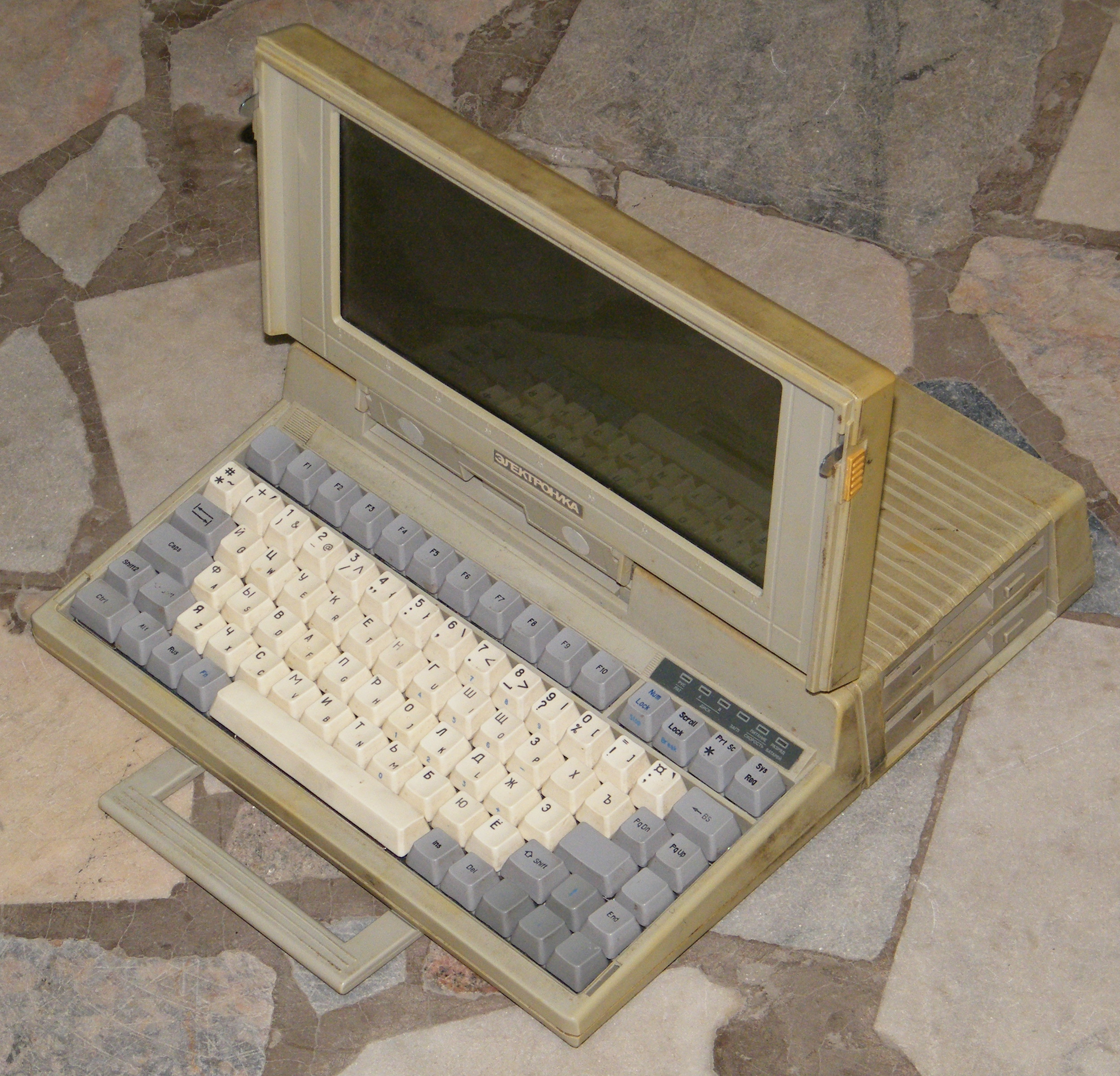
Elektronika MS 1504 laptop

The following Elektronika computers used a Soviet Intel-compatible CPU:

- MS 1502, MS 1504 – XT clone
- KR-series (01/02/03/04) – mass production of popular Russian 8-bit homebrew RK-86 (ru:Радио 86РК).

The following Elektronika computers used a Soviet CPU, compatible with PDP-11:

- Elektronika 60
- UKNC
- DVK – clone of SM EVM, stripped for mass production to satisfy general scientific and R&D needs.
- BK-0010 and BK-0011M – stripped and low-cost version of DVK, targeted at teenagers and home users.

== Electronic games and toys ==
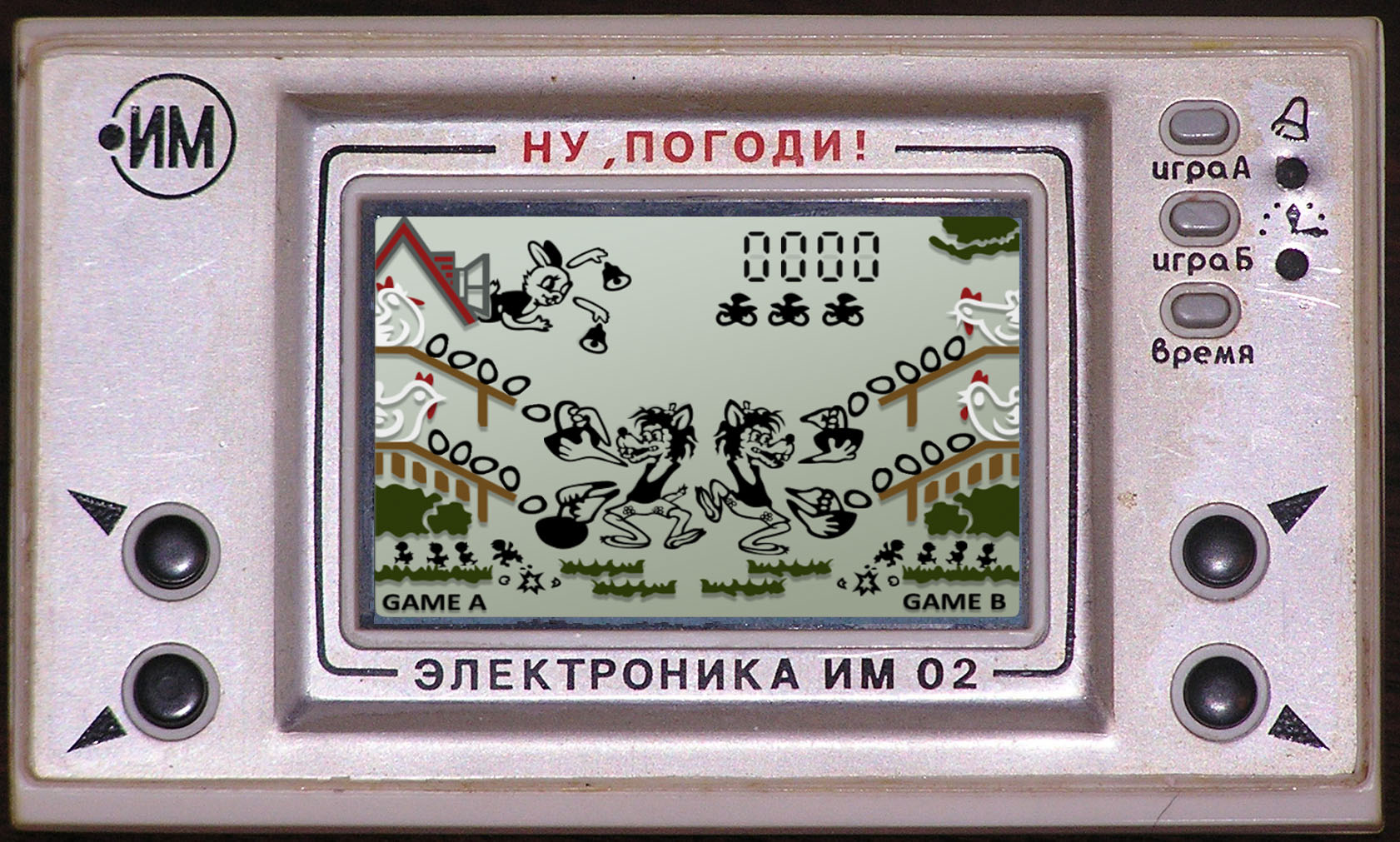
Elektronika IM-02

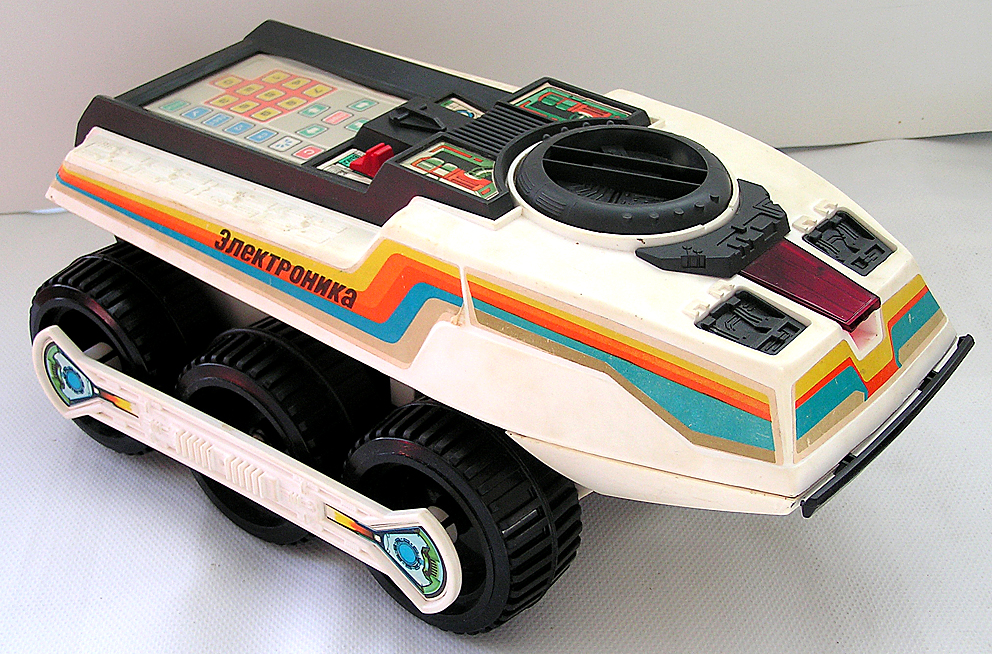
Elektronika IM-11

Most Elektronika-branded electronic toys were Nintendo Game & Watch clones. These used the KB1013VK1-2 microprocessor, a Soviet clone of the Sharp SM-5A used in Game & Watch consoles.

The vast majority of the Elektronika electronic toys had model names that start with IM (ИМ – Игра Микропроцессорная, a Russian acronym for "microprocessor based game").

Some model names for Elektronika branded clones start with IE (ИЭ – Игра Электронная, a Russian acronym for "electronic game").

The Elektronika electronic toys that had model names beginning with MG were manufactured by Angstrem and were designed for export with English packaging and inserts.

The known models include:

- IM-01 Chess computer (1986) – designed and manufactured by Svetlana.
- IM-01T Chess computer (1992) – improved version of the IM-01, designed and manufactured by Svetlana.
- IM-02 Well, Just You Wait! (1984) – Nintendo EG-26 Egg, a variation of Mickey Mouse without the Disney license.
- IM-03 Mysteries of the Ocean (1986) – Nintendo OC-22 Octopus
- IM-04 Merry Cook (1989) – Nintendo FP-24 Chef
- IM-05 Chess computer (1989) – improved version of the IM-01, designed and manufactured by Svetlana.
- MG-09 Space Bridge (1989) – Nintendo FR-27 Fire
- IM-10 Ice Hockey (1988) – ice hockey-themed clone of Nintendo EG-26 Egg
- IM-11 Lunokhod (1983) – Milton Bradley Big Trak programmable battery-powered toy tank
- IM-12 Winnie the Pooh (1991) – Nintendo CJ-93 Donkey Kong Jr. panorama
- MG-13 Explorers of Space, also known as Space Scouts (1989)
- IM-15 Electronic Football – Tomy World Cup Soccer
- IM-18 Fowling (1989)
- IM-19 Biathlon
- IM-22 Monkey Goalkeeper, also known as Merry Footballer (1989)
- IM-23 Autoslalom (1989) / Car Slalom (1991)
- 24-01 Mickey Mouse (1984) – Nintendo MC-25 Mickey Mouse
- IM-26 Interchangeable, display cartridges included IM-02 Well, Just You Wait!, IM-22 Merry Footballer, IM-23 Autoslalom, IM-10 Ice Hockey, and IM-32 Cat Fisherman (1991) – Bandai Digi Casse
- IM-27 Space game
- IM-28 Electronic quiz game
- IM-29 Chess Partner (1991) – Mattel Electronics Computer Chess
- IM-30 Orpheus synthesizer (1991) – designed and manufactured by Svetlana.
- IM-32 Cat Fisherman / Fisher Tom-Cat (1991)
- IM-37 Football
- IM-45 English learning computer
- IM-50 Space Flight (1992)
- MG-50 Amusing Arithmetics (1989)
- IM-55 Basketball

Post-1992 versions:

- I-01 Car Slalom
- I-02 Merry Cook
- I-03 Space Bridge
- I-04 Fisher Tom-Cat
- I-05 Naval Combat
- I-06 Just You wait!
- I-07 Frog boaster
- I-08 Fowling
- I-09 Explorers of Space
- I-10 Biathlon
- I-11 Circus
- I-12 Hockey
- I-13 Merry Footballer
- I-14 Night Thiefes
- I-15 Mysteries of the Ocean
- I-20 (option 1) Air Shooting Range (1994) – Nintendo BU-201 Spitball Sparky
- I-20 (option 2) Supercubes (1994) – Tetris

== Tape recorders (audio) ==
=== Reel-to-reel ===
- 100S (1970, portable stereo)
- ТА1-003 Stereo (1980)
- 004 Stereo
- MPK 007 S (1987)

=== Cassette ===
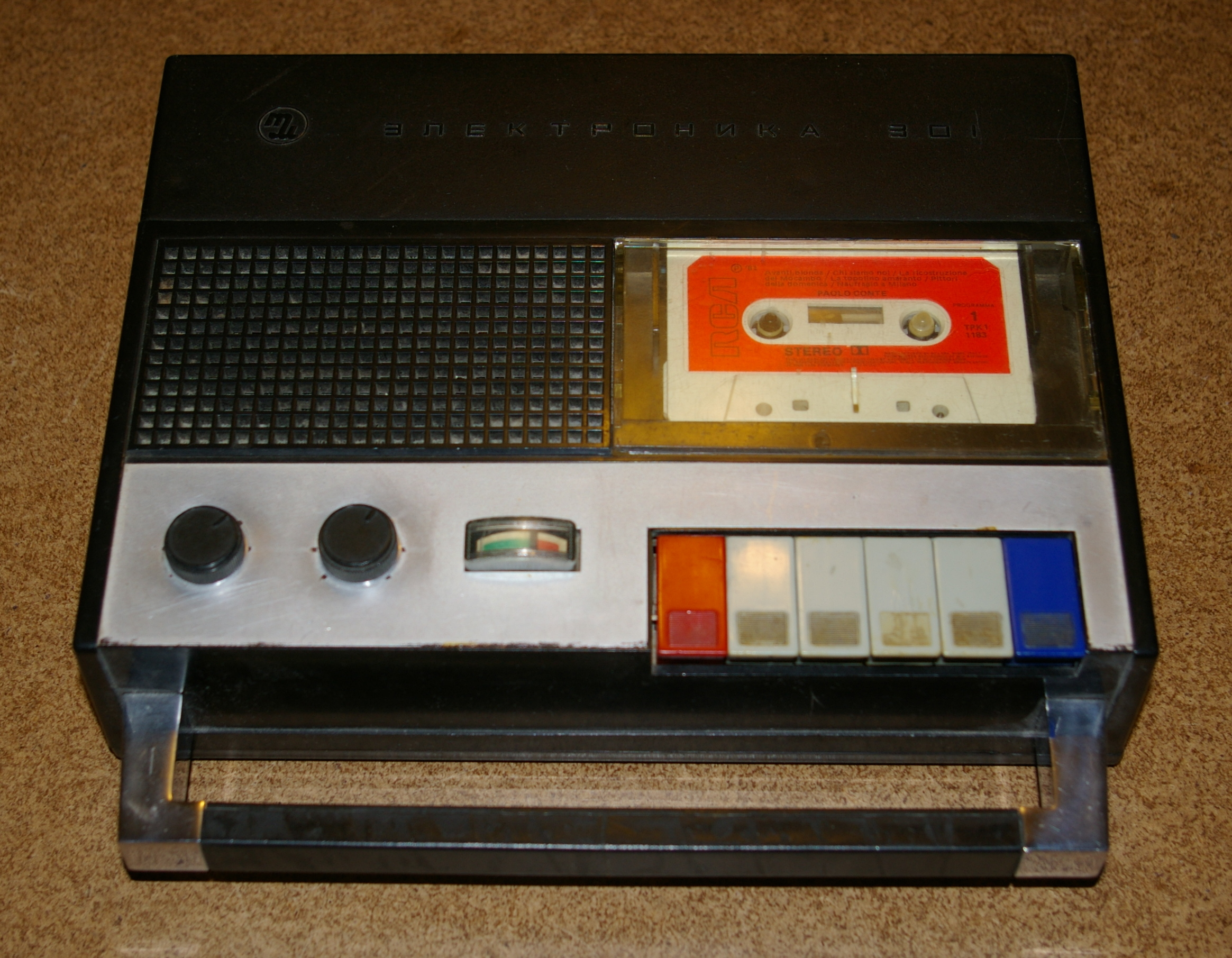
Elektronika 301

- 203-S (1980, portable stereo)
- 204-S (1984, stereo deck)
- MH-205 stereo (1985, car stereo player)
- 206-stereo
- 211-S (1983, portable stereo)
- 301 (1972, portable)
- 302, 302-1, 302-2 (1974 till 1990s, portable)
- 305 (1984, portable)
- 306 (1986, portable stereo)
- 311-S (1977, portable stereo)
- 321/322 (1978, portable)
- 323/324 (1981, portable)
- M-327 (1987, portable)
- M-334S (1990, portable stereo component system with detachable recorder M-332S)
- М-402S (1990, pocket stereo)
- Elektronika-mini (199?, pocket stereo)
