= Big Trak =

Programmable toy created by Milton Bradley in 1979

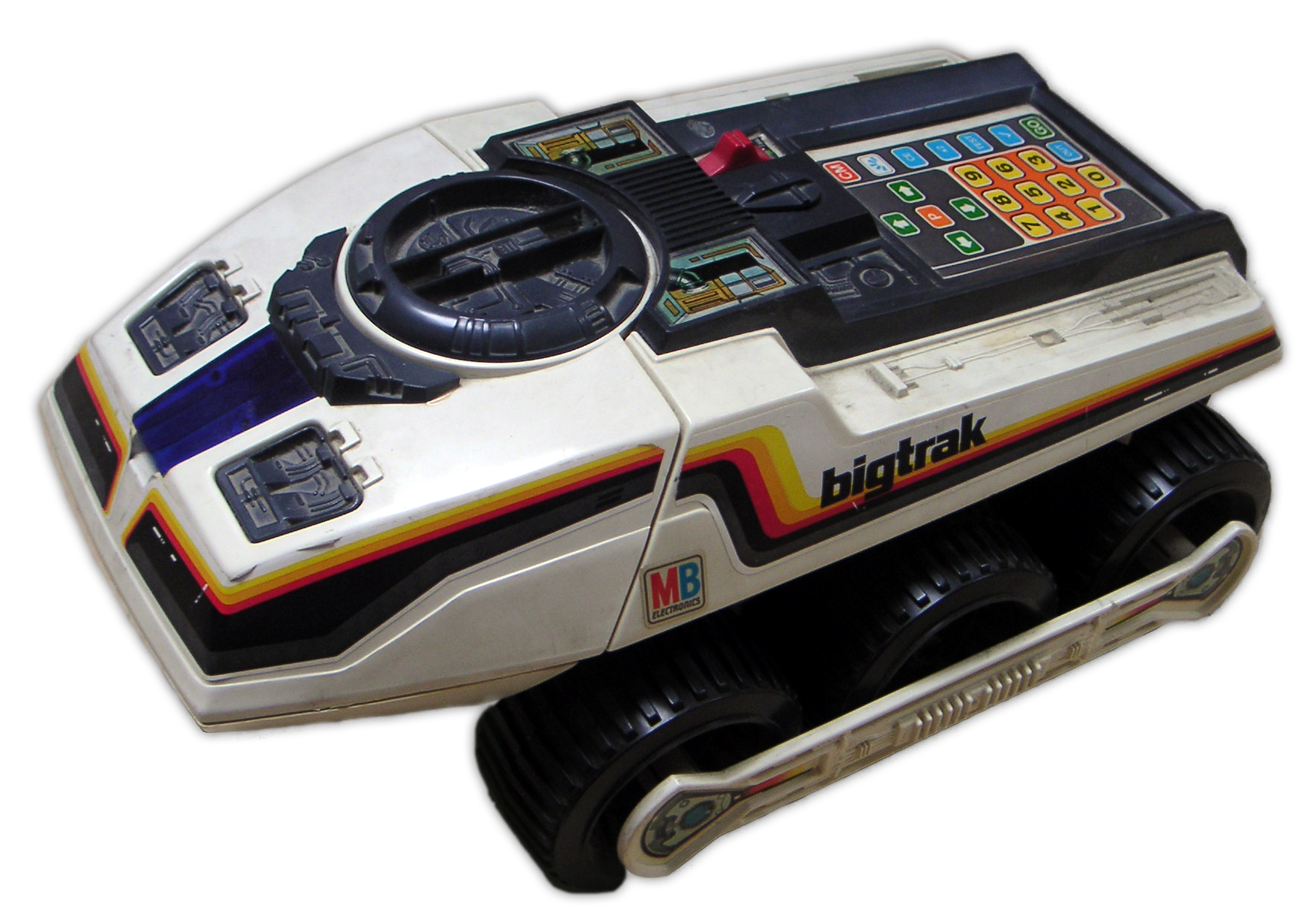
- A UK BigTrak
- Manufacturer: Milton Bradley
- Type: programmable electric vehicle
- Released: 1979

BIG TRAK / bigtrak is a programmable toy electric vehicle created by Milton Bradley in 1979, resembling a futuristic Sci-Fi tank / utility vehicle. The original Big Trak was a six-wheeled (two-wheel drive) tank with a front-mounted blue "photon beam" headlamp, and a keypad on top. The toy could remember up to 16 commands, which it then executed in sequence. There also was an optional cargo trailer accessory, with the UK version being white to match its colour scheme; once hooked to the Bigtrak, this trailer could be programmed to dump its payload.

In 2010, BIG TRAK was relaunched in the form of a slightly modified replica (cosmetically very similar to the original UK bigtrak), produced under licence by Zeon Ltd. There is also a small dedicated Internet community who have reverse engineered the BIG TRAK and the Texas Instruments TMS1000 microcontroller inside it.

== Versions ==
=== The original Milton Bradley US and UK versions ===
UK version of the keypad

The US and UK/European versions were noticeably different. The US version was moulded in gray plastic and labelled "BIG TRAK", while the UK version was white and labelled "bigtrak" with a different keypad.

The US version had Revision C, D, and E motherboards, while the UK/European had Revision L and so on.

=== The Soviet Lunokhod and Planetokhod ===
In the Soviet Union, a clone was made under "Elektronika IM-11" designation. The early production version was named Lunokhod after the Lunokhod programme. It featured an obstruction sensor disguised as a plastic front bumper, which would stop the program when the toy got stuck. However, there was no provision for an accessory, and its motion sensor was based on a cheaper reed switch instead of an opto-isolator. A later version, named "Planetokhod," additionally featured a shootable rotor blade as an accessory, LED head and rear lamps, and the on/off switch was relocated to the rear side. A Soviet popular science journal Nauka i Zhizn published a detailed article on the IM-11.

=== The Zeon Ltd replica ===
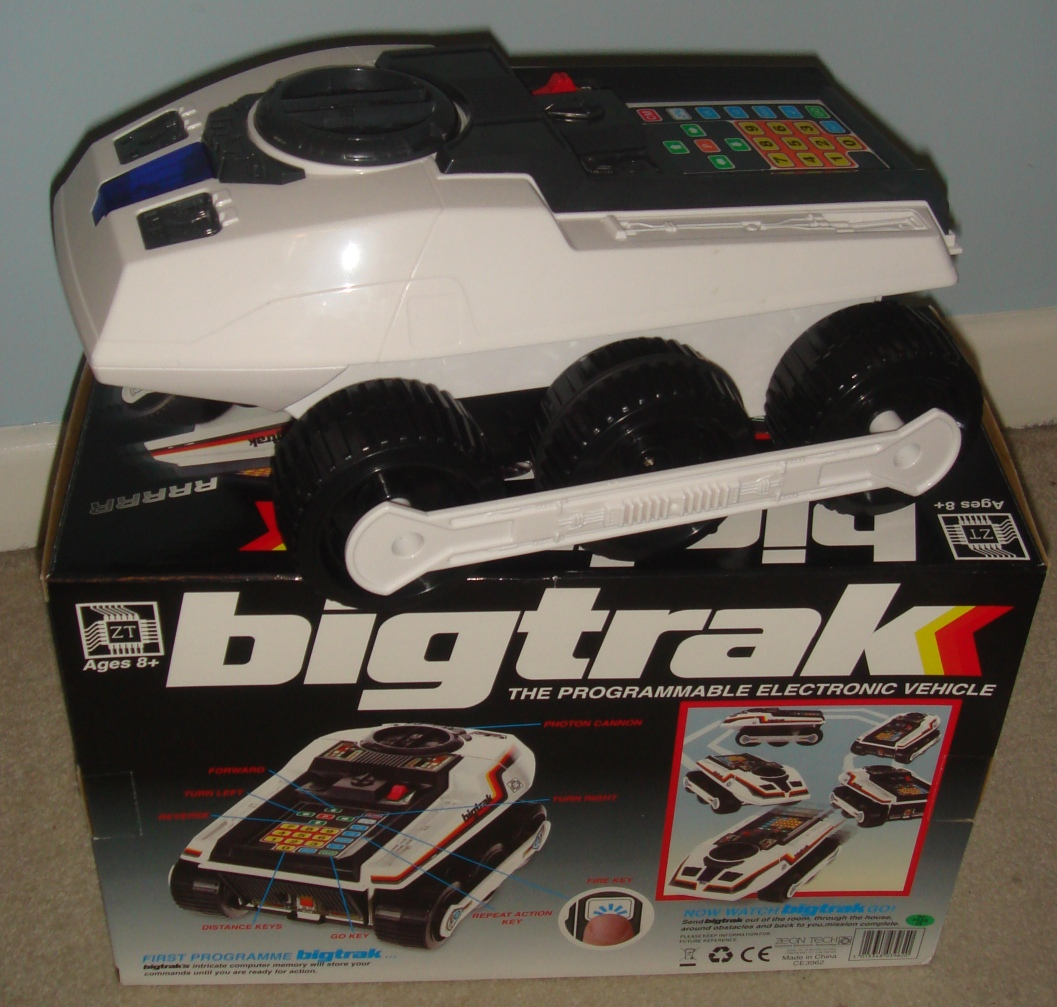
Zeon 2010 Bigtrak – no stickers affixed.

In 2010, Zeon Ltd released a replica of the original toy. The colour and graphic scheme are based on the UK version and all stickers have been redrawn as a direct copy of the original artwork. However, the replica differs in several ways from the original. 1) The circular hatch on the original was removable, to allow access to the 9v battery powering the electronics. On the replica, this hatch is fixed shut as the 9v battery is no longer used. 2) The main electronics circuit board is completely different, with surface-mount components and a different processor chip and software. 3) Motor rotation is detected by rotating magnets fitted to the motors, and Hall effect detectors on the circuit board - the original used optical detectors. 4) The original used an incandescent light bulb; the replica uses an LED. 5) The original used 4 x 'D' cell batteries and a 9v PP3 battery; the replica just uses 3 x 'D' cells. Since the initial release of the replica, a second version has been introduced, the differences being in the test program and the power switch. Version 1 has a single-position power switch, either on or off, whereas version 2 has a 3-position power switch, centre off, forward for use on carpets, back for use on smooth floors. This affects the stall-detection in the electronics, as the original version seems to have been designed to run on smooth floors, and easily stalls when attempting to turn on carpet. The test program for version 1 runs the unit forwards, pauses, then runs backwards; in version 2, the model runs forward, then turns 180 degrees, runs forward again, then backs up a little.

=== The Bigtrak Rover ===
A new model, the Bigtrak Rover, is scheduled for release by Zeon Ltd in late 2014. This model is based on the Junior chassis. "Robotics go back to the future with the retro looks of smash-hit 80s toy Bigtrak working together with high-tech smartphone technology. Now you can have your very own mini Bigtrak robot controlled by your smart device. Rover's on-board camera streams live video from his field of view, directly to your computer, tablet or phone. Bigtrak Rover uses contactless technology to go exploring. He will go forwards, backwards and spin both clockwise and anti-clockwise. Cones are included for orienteering fun. Bigtrak Rover can be controlled by simply downloading a free App from the App Store or Android Marketplace and then follows commands from your iPhone, Android device, PC, Mac or tablet. Bigtrak Rover does not draw any power from your smartphone, and does not require Bluetooth or Wi-Fi connectivity."

=== The Bigtrak XTR ===
The Bigtrak XTR was intended for release in 2012 but has not yet launched as of January 2020. It is an updated version of Bigtrak, its form based on the Bigtrak Jr with the 'cockpit' modified to be much smaller and streamlined. It can be controlled remotely using a computer, iOS, or Android device. The controls for the iOS / Android version allow for either tilting control or touch control.

A foldable tray hides and protects the keypad from accidental input. The tray also functions as a cargo area that can detect an object placed on it. The Bigtrak XTR has two ports for optional accessories, one on the top and one on the front. The accessories are: Camera (XTRcam), computer communication module (XTRCom) that also allows another accessory to be plugged to it, light (LightBar), Infrared emitter (IRGun), and projectiles (XTRMissile). The camera can track an object.

=== The Dubreq desktop version, Bigtrak Jr ===
Dubreq Ltd under license from Zeon Ltd has released a 190mm long desktop version of the Bigtrak toy called "Bigtrak Jr". Like the original Bigtrak from the 1970s, it has an active accessory port for accessories including a rocket launcher (as an active accessory) and a drinks can carrier (as a passive accessory).

== Power ==
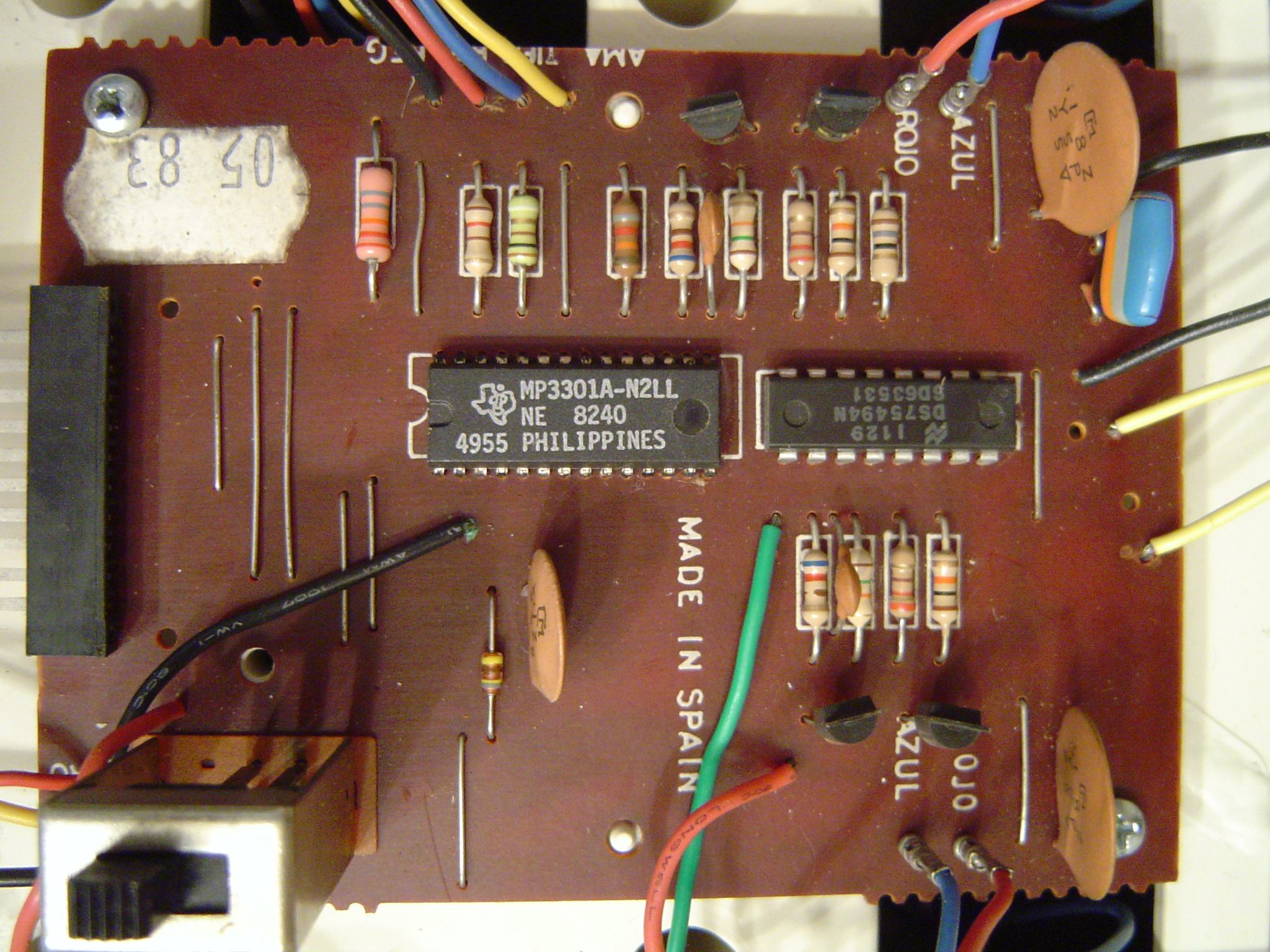
BigTrak main board. Made in Spain, with a microcontroller chip made in the Philippines.

The original Big Trak uses a 9 volt battery to power its microcontroller, while the 4 D cell batteries are used to power its electric motors. This electrical isolation helps prevent any electrical noise from the motor, speaker, and lamp from resetting or interfering with the microcontroller. The re-release Zeon version uses only 3 D cell batteries to power both its microcontroller and electric motors, while the Bigtrak Jr version only needs 3 AA batteries to power both its microcontroller and electric motors.

The original optional cargo trailer uses a single D cell battery to power its electrical motor, both for driving and dumping operations, while the optional rocket launcher accessory for the Bigtrak Jr uses 3 AA batteries.

== Programming the Big Trak ==
Various commands can be given, such as: "go forward 5 lengths", "pause", "turn 15 minutes right (90 degrees)", "fire phaser", and so on. There is also a "repeat" instruction allowing simple loop to be performed, but the language is not Turing complete, lacking branching instructions; its programming also resembles the principles of turtle graphics from Logo programming language.

The Big Trak also lacks any sort of sensor input other than the wheel sensors, though recent re-released versions do have the ability to accept optional external input.

== Programmable keypad ==
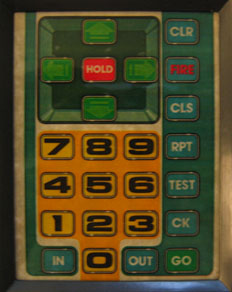
BigTrak Keypad (US)

There were no LED displays or ways to display program instructions, beyond actually running the program, which was done by pressing "GO". Each command inputted will be added next to the previous command inputted, allowing the operator to build a list of commands up to 16 commands.

All programming to BigTrak was done through the keypad shown here:

- Forward/Backwards: Move forward or backwards in units of body length
- Left/Right: Turn left or right in units of roughly 1/60th of a full rotation
- HOLD: Pause in 1/10 of second time units (UK version; P: Pause)
- FIRE: Fire the light bulb "laser" (UK; Photon Symbol)
- CLR: Clear the program (UK; CM: Clear Memory)
- CLS: Clear Last Step (UK; CE: Clear Entry)
- RPT: Repeat a number of steps (primitive loop) (UK; x2: Repeat key)
- TEST: Run short test program
- CK: Check last instruction (UK; Tick symbol)
- Out: Dump optional trailer accessory
- In: Reserved for future expansion (UK; missing. Disabled or not implemented on most if not all BigTraks)

=== In and Out commands ===
The Bigtrak is capable of communicating with an optional accessory. It uses an electrical 3.5 mm jack for its communication. Older bigger Bigtrak can also use a Bigtrak Jr optional accessory with an adaptor. However the newer Bigtrak XTR uses a different type of communication port, therefore it is not compatible with any previous Bigtrak accessory.

The Out command is used in the 1970s/1980s Bigtrack to dump the cargo on its optional cargo trailer accessory. While in the modern 2010s Bigtrack, it is used to do things such as shooting missiles.

However, the hardware on the late 1970s and early 1980s Bigtraks does not seem to be capable of processing any In command.

== Computer control ==
In 1981 Steve Ciarcia published in his BYTE column "Ciarcia's Circuit Cellar" an article on controlling Big Trak with a personal computer and radio interface, turning it into a home robot.

Meanwhile, in the 2000s and 2010s, many people have hacked the Bigtrak by allowing it to be controlled with modern microcontrollers such as the Arduino, or even a single board Personal Computer such as the Raspberry Pi. The Bigtrak XTR is capable of being fitted with a communication module to wirelessly communicate with a computer.

== Big Trak in psychological research ==
In the early 1980s, the psychology of science community led by the laboratory of David Klahr at Carnegie Mellon University adopted the Big Trak as a research vehicle for the study of Instructionless learning, Scientific discovery, View application, Cognitive development, and Dual Space Search.

== Reception ==
Games magazine included Big Trak in their "Top 100 Games of 1981", finding it a "great challenge is to program Big Trak to run through an obstacle course, without pacing off the distances".

== Lawsuit ==
In Episode 827 Act One of This American Life, Peter Ocko tells the story of coming up with the idea of Big Trak when his father worked at Milton Bradley, and then the lawsuit they filed against Milton Bradley.

== See also ==
- Lego Mindstorms NXT
- Omnibot
- RoboSapien – a remote-programmable humanoid robot
- Roomba
