= K1810VM86 =

Soviet 8086 microprocessor clone

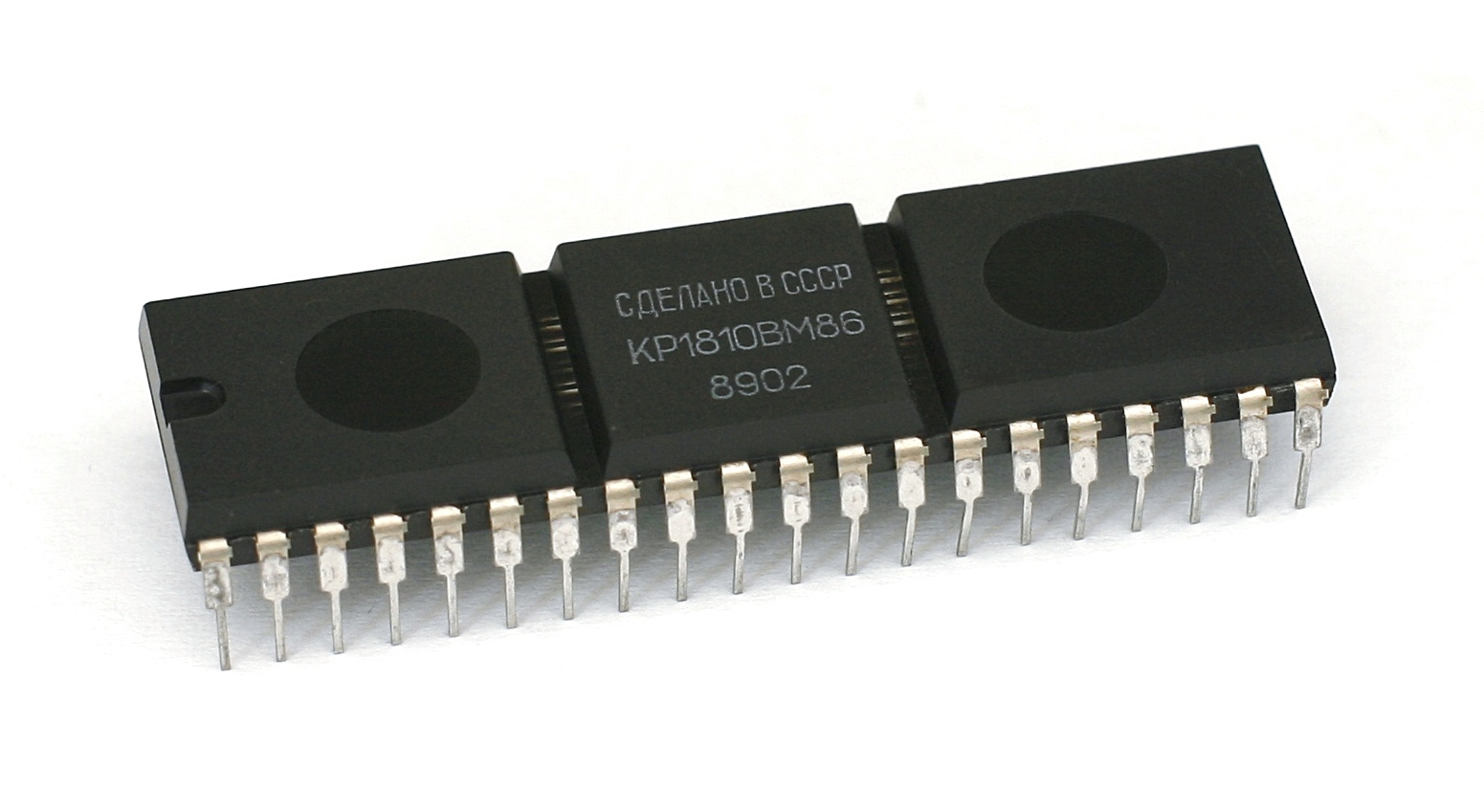

Performance
- Max. CPU clock rate: 2 MHz to 8 MHz

Physical specifications
- Package: 40 pin DIP

Architecture and classification
- Instruction set: x86-16

History
- Predecessor: KR580VM80A

The K1810VM86 (Russian: К1810ВМ86) is a Soviet 16-bit microprocessor, a clone of the Intel 8086 CPU with which it is binary and pin compatible. It was developed between 1982 and 1985. The original K1810VM86 supported a clock frequency of up to 5 MHz while up to 8 MHz were allowed for the later K1810VM86M (К1810ВМ86M; corresponding to Intel 8086-2). The K1810VM86 was manufactured plastic 40-pin dual in-line package (as KR1810VM86 / КР1810ВМ86) or in a 40-pin ceramic dual in-line package (as KM1810VM86 / КМ1810ВМ86 for the commercial version or M1810VM86 / М1810ВМ86 for the military version). A clone of the related Intel 8088 with its 8-bit bus was manufactured as the K1810VM88 (Russian: К1810ВМ88), also in plastic and ceramic packages.

== Technology and support chips ==
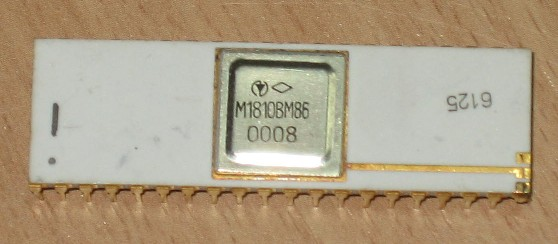
M1810VM86, military version in a ceramic package

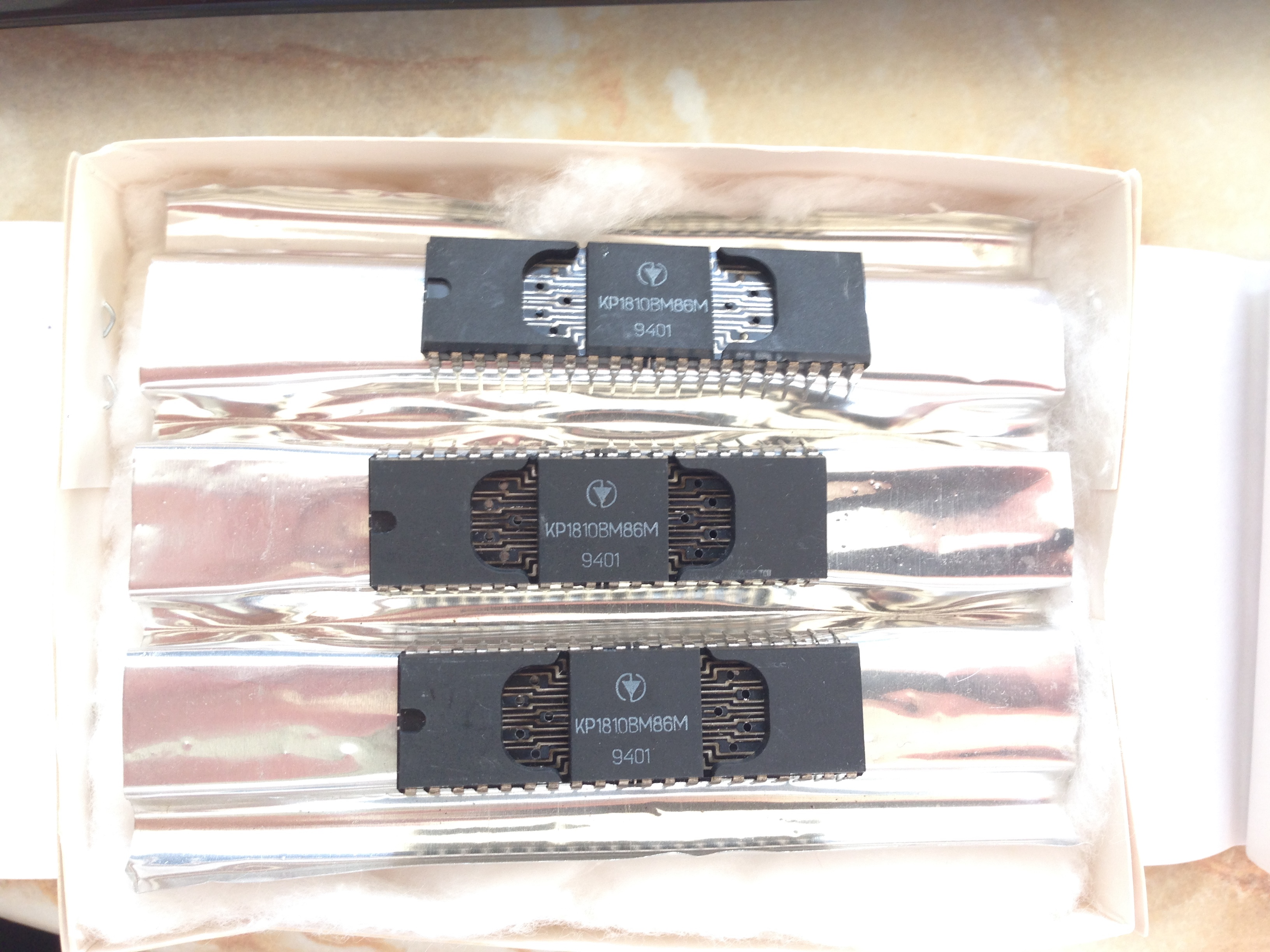
KR1810VM86M, equivalent to Intel 8086-2 (8 MHz clock)

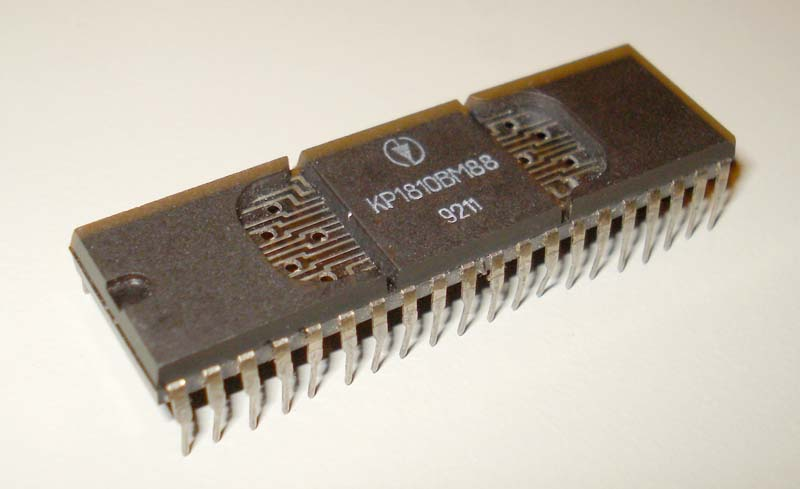
KR1810VM88, equivalent to Intel 8088, plastic package

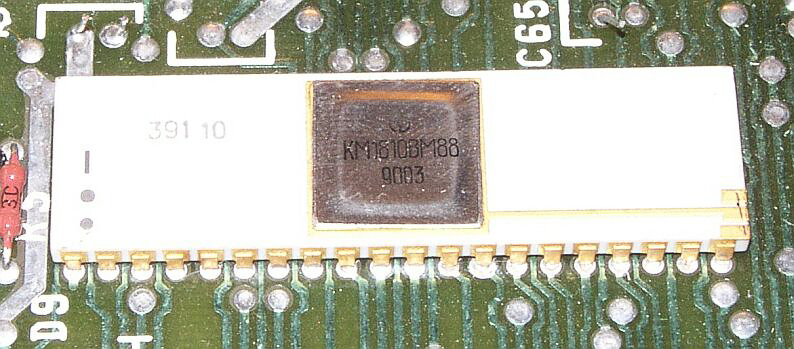
KM1810VM88, equivalent to Intel 8088, ceramic package

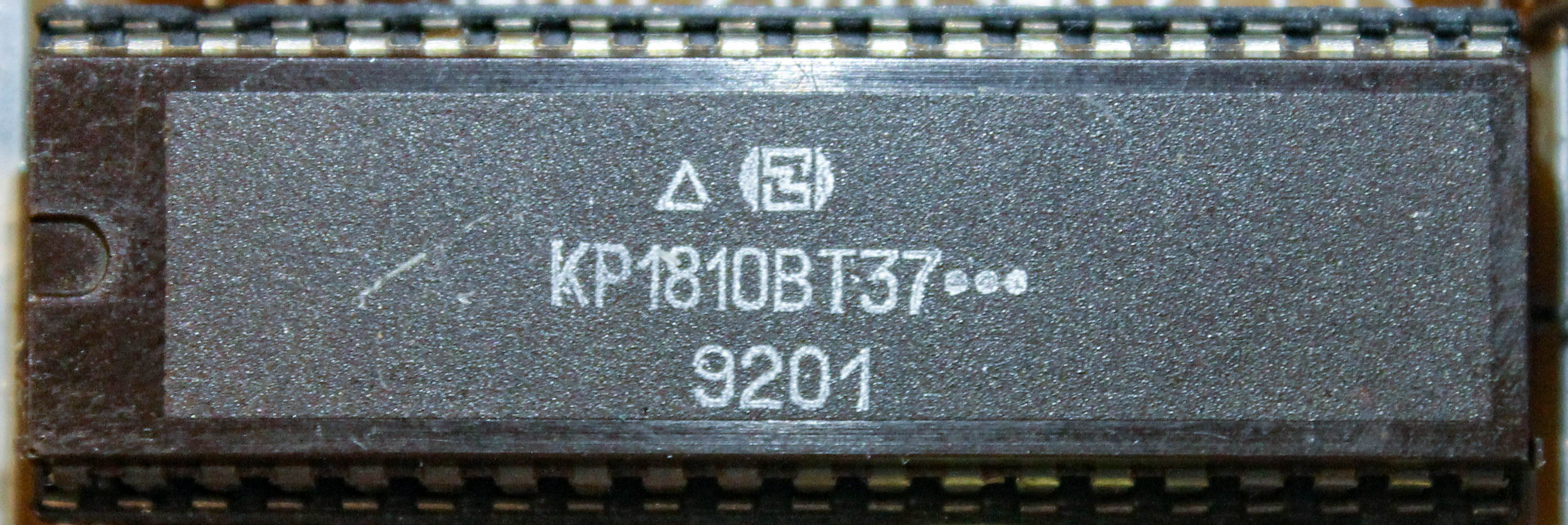
DMA controller KR1810VT37, manufactured by Rodon Ivano-Frankivsk, 1992

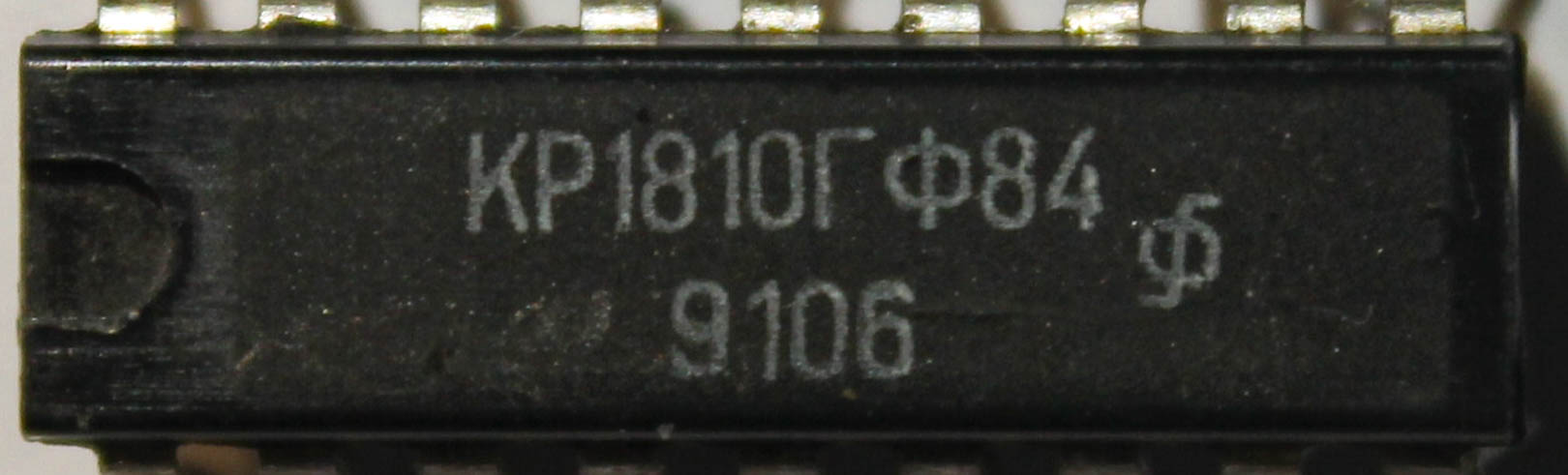
Clock generator KR1810GF84, manufactured by Elektronpribor Fryazino, 1991

The K1810VM86 was manufactured with an n-MOS process.

The family consists of the following chips:

Designation		Intel equivalent	Description
Russian	English	Intel equivalent	Description
КР1810ВМ86	KR1810VM86	Intel 8086	central processing unit, 16-bit bus
КМ1810ВМ87	KM1810VM87	Intel 8087	floating-point coprocessor
КР1810ВМ88	KR1810VM88	Intel 8088	central processing unit, 8-bit bus
КР1810ВМ89	KR1810VM89	Intel 8089	input/output coprocessor
КР1810ВТ2	KR1810VT2	Intel 8202	DRAM controller, 16KB
КР1810ВТ3	KR1810VT3	Intel 8203	DRAM controller, 64KB
КР1810ВТ37	KR1810VT37	Intel 8237	DMA controller
КР1810ВИ54	KR1810VI54	Intel 8254	programmable interval timer
КР1810ВК56	KR1810VK56	Intel 8256AH	multifunction universal asynchronous receiver/transmitter
КР1810ВТ57А	KR1810VT57A	Intel 8257	programmable DMA controller
КР1810ВН59А	KR1810VN59A	Intel 8259A	programmable interrupt controller
КР1810ВГ72А	KR1810VG72A	Intel 8272A	floppy-disk controller
КР1810ГФ84	KR1810GF84	Intel 8284	system clock generator/driver
КР1810ВГ88	KR1810VG88	Intel 8288	bus controller
КР1810ВБ89	KR1810VB89	Intel 8289	bus arbiter

For brevity, the table above lists only the chip variants in a plastic DIP (prefix КР). Not listed separately are variants in a ceramic DIP (prefix КМ for commercial version and prefix М for the military version).

Additionally, many devices in the K580 series could be used for the K1810 series as well.

== Applications ==
Unlike the earlier KR580VM80A which was very popular in the Soviet Union but little used elsewhere, the K1810VM86 was widely used throughout the Eastern Bloc due to it being one of the first 16-bit microprocessors available there and among those the only one with an x86 instruction set, allowing it to run MS-DOS. Examples for personal computers built based on the K1810VM86 (or the 8-bit bus variant K1810VM88) are:

- Iskra-502, Iskra-1030, Iskra-1130, Poisk in the Soviet Union
- Mazovia 1016 in Poland
- PP 01.16 in Czechoslovakia
- A7100, A7150, EC1834 in East Germany

== Further development ==
CMOS versions equivalent to the Intel 80C86 were named KR1834VM86 (КР1834ВМ86; developed in Kiev in 1989 / 1990 and then manufactured in Minsk) and KR1835VM86 (КР1835ВМ86). The original KR1810VM86 is still shown on the price list of 1 July 2026 of the "Kvazar" plant in Kyiv together with various support chips of the K580 and K1810 series, while the newer CMOS versions appear to be no longer in production.

A clone of the Intel 80C286 was manufactured under the name KR1847VM286 (КР1847ВМ286) but apparently did not see widespread use.

No other processors with an x86 instruction set were designed in the Soviet Union until much later the 1875VD1T (1875ВД1Т, equivalent to the Intel 80C186) and 1875VD2T (1875ВД2Т, equivalent to the Intel 80386EXTB).

== See also ==
- Soviet integrated circuit designation
