= TIA-MC-1 =

Soviet arcade machine

The TIA-MC-1 (Russian: ТИА-МЦ-1) — Телевизионный Игровой Автомат Многокадровый Цветной (pronounced Televizionniy Igrovoi Automat Mnogokadrovyi Tcvetnoi; meaning Video Game Machine – Multiframe Colour) was a Soviet arcade machine with replaceable game programs and was one of the most famous arcade machines from the Soviet Union. The TIA-MC-1 was developed in Vinnytsia, Ukraine by the Ekstrema-Ukraina company in the mid-1980s under the leadership of V.B. Gerasimov. The machine was manufactured by the production association Terminal and some other factories.

== Games ==
Some of the TIA-MC-1 based games are:

- Автогонки (Avtogonki, Autoracing)
- Биллиард (Billiard, a pool-like game)
- Звёздный рыцарь (Zvezdnyi Rytsar, Star Knight)
- Истребитель (Istrebiteli, Fighter Jet, Harrier)
- Конёк-Горбунок (Konek-Gorbunok, The Humpbacked Horse by Pyotr Pavlovich Yershov)
- Кот-рыболов (Kot-Rybolov, Cat the fisher)
- Котигорошко (Kotigoroshko, title of a Ukrainian fairy tale)
- Остров дракона (Ostrov Drakona, Dragon Island)
- Остров сокровищ (Ostrov Sokrovish, Treasure Island by Robert Louis Stevenson)
- Снежная королева (Snezhnaja koroleva, The Snow Queen by Hans Christian Andersen)
- S.O.S.

The Konek-Gurbunok game is comparable to The Legend of Zelda and included environments such as forests and castles.

== Technical specifications ==
The arcade machine consists of several boards called BEIA (Russian:БЭИА, Блок Элементов Игрового Автомата, Blok Elementov Igrovogo Automata). The boards have the following purposes:

- BEIA-100: data processing; RGB DAC; sound generation; coin-op and game controller interface
- BEIA-101: video sync and background generation
- BEIA-102: sprite generation
- BEIA-103: game ROM and main RAM

Games in a TIA-MC-1 arcade machine can be switched by replacing the BEIA-103 module, not unlike cartridges in video game consoles.

Main system characteristics are as follows:

- CPU: КР580ВМ80А (clone of Intel 8080), 1.78 MHz
- Video resolution: 256×256, 4 bits per pixel selectable from a palette of 256 colors
  - Background: two video pages composed of 32×32 tiles, each tile is 8×8 pixels. Tile RAM can store 256 separate tiles.
  - Sprites: up to 16 simultaneously displayed hardware-generated sprites; total of 256 sprites can be stored in sprite ROM. Sprites can be vertically and horizontally mirrored in hardware.
- Sound: two КР580ВИ53 interval timers (Intel 8253) driving a mono speaker.
- Display: 20" (51 cm) TV screen
- Main RAM — 8KiB.
- Character RAM — 8KiB.
- Video RAM — 2KiB.
- Sprite ROM — 32KiB.
- ROM with game code and background graphics — up to 56KiB.

== Emulation ==
For a long time the TIA-MC-1 hardware remained unemulated due to a lack of technical information and ROM dumps. Soon after the Russian emulation community obtained technical documentation and ROM dumps of one of the games, Konek-Gorbunok, the first emulator named TIA-MC Emulator was released on July 27, 2006. A TIA-MC-1 driver was included in MAME on August 21, 2006 (since version 0.108). By now, only five games (Konek-Gorbunok, S.O.S., Billiard, Snezhnaja koroleva, Kot-Rybolov) are dumped and supported by emulators. An ongoing search for other games is in progress.

== See also ==
- Photon (arcade cabinet)
- List of Soviet computer systems
