= Hobbit (computer) =

Soviet/Russian 8-bit home computer

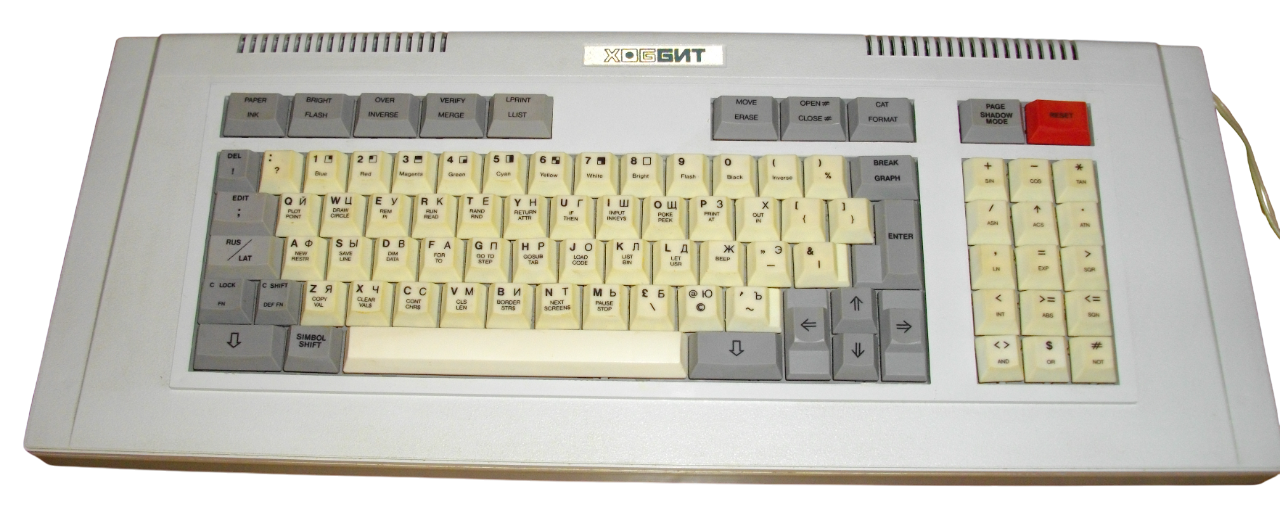
- Also known as: Хоббит (Russian)
- Type: Home computer
- Released: 1990; 36 years ago
- Discontinued: 1993
- Operating system: Sinclair BASIC, Logo, CP/M, Forth
- CPU: clone of Zilog Z80 @ 3.5 MHz
- Memory: 64 KB
- Removable storage: external 5.25-inch drives
- Display: Composite video out, EGA monitor
- Sound: Beeper
- Connectivity: Joystick ports, Centronics, RS-232, audio in/out, system bus extension

Hobbit (Russian: Хоббит) is a Soviet/Russian 8-bit home computer, based on the ZX Spectrum hardware architecture. Besides Sinclair BASIC it also featured CP/M, Forth or LOGO modes, with the Forth or LOGO operating environment residing in an on-board ROM chip.

== Overview ==
Hobbit was invented by Dmitry Mikhailov (Russian: Дмитрий Михайлов) (all R&D) and Mikhail Osetinskii (Russian: Михаил Осетинский) (management) in Leningrad, Russia in the late 1980s. The original circuit layout was designed on a home-made computer (built in 1979 using ASMP of three KR580 chips – Soviet Intel 8080 clones), also created by Dmitry Mikhailov. The computer was manufactured by the joint venture InterCompex.

Hobbit was marketed in the former Soviet Union as a low-cost personal computer solution for basic educational and office needs, in addition to its obvious use as a home computer. Schools would use it on the classrooms, interconnecting several machines and forming a 56K baud network. It was possible to use another Hobbit or a IBM PC compatible with a special Hobbit network adapter card by InterCompex as a master host on the network.

The Hobbit was also briefly marketed in the U.K., targeted mainly at the existing ZX Spectrum fans wanting a more advanced computer compatible with the familiar architecture. It was mentioned on Your Sinclair September 1990 and January 1991 issues; Crash April 1992 issue, and on Sinclair User August and September 1992 issues, highlighting the available Forth language and CP/M operating system.

Domestic models often did not include the TV output, the internal speaker or both. The AY8910 chip for the domestic models was sold separately as an external extension module, hanging off the same extension bus as the optional external disk drive.

Another extension was the SME (Screen and Memory Extension) board. This featured 32 KB of cache memory, some of which could be dedicated to a video text buffer in CGA mode (only supported by drivers in the Forth or the CP/M environments; no known programs using the Sinclair-based BASIC mode used this feature). SME worked at astonishing speed – one machine code command made an output of an entire display line. SME was capable of rendering several dozens of windows per second, and its capabilities were fully utilized only in the Forth environment.

== Technical details ==
- Z80A at 3.5 MHz
- 64K RAM
- Disk drives: external 2 × 5.25-inch drives (up to 4 connectable) or internal 3.5-inch drive
- Connections: joystick (2 × Sinclair, 1 × Kempston), Centronics, RS-232, audio in/out (for cassette recorder), system bus extension
- 74-key keyboard (33 keys freely programmable)
- Video output: Composite video TV out, EGA monitor
- Operating system: built in disassembler, CP/M clone called "Beta", system language switchable between English and Russian
