= Elektronika 60 =

Soviet micro-computer

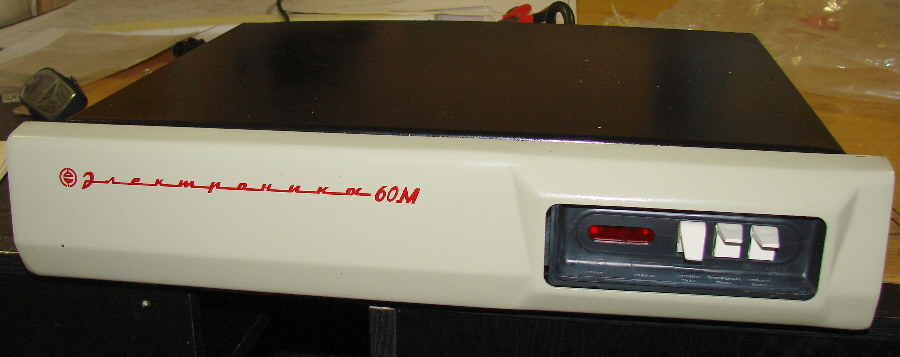
- Elektronika 60M
- Developer: Elektronika
- Type: Minicomputer
- Released: 1978
- Discontinued: 1991
- Operating system: RT-11 and other
- CPU: M2 (Soviet LSI-11--PDP-11 LSI CPU implementation--clone)
- Memory: 4kb 16-bit words; max 32k 16-bit words

The Elektronika 60 (Russian: Электроника 60) is a computer made in the Soviet Union by Elektronika in Voronezh from 1978 until 1991. It is a rack-mounted system with no built-in display or storage devices. It was usually paired with a 15IE-00-013 terminal and I/O devices. The main logic unit is located on the M2 CPU board. As an unlicensed clone implementation of the DEC PDP-11/23, the Elektronika 60 is generally software-compatible, could use much of the same peripherals, and physically resembles that model.

The original implementation of Tetris was written for the Elektronika 60 by Alexey Pajitnov in 1985. As the Elektronika 60 does not have raster graphics, text characters were used to form the blocks.

== Technical specifications ==
M2 CPU:

- LSI-11 (PDP-11 LSI CPU implementation) clone
- Word length: 16 bits
- Address space: 32K words (64 KB)
- RAM size: 4K words (8 KB)
- Number of instructions: 81
- Performance: 250,000 operations per second
- Floating-point capacity: 32 bits
- Number of VLSI chips: 5
- Board dimensions: 240 × 280 mm
