= PS-2000 =

ПС-2000
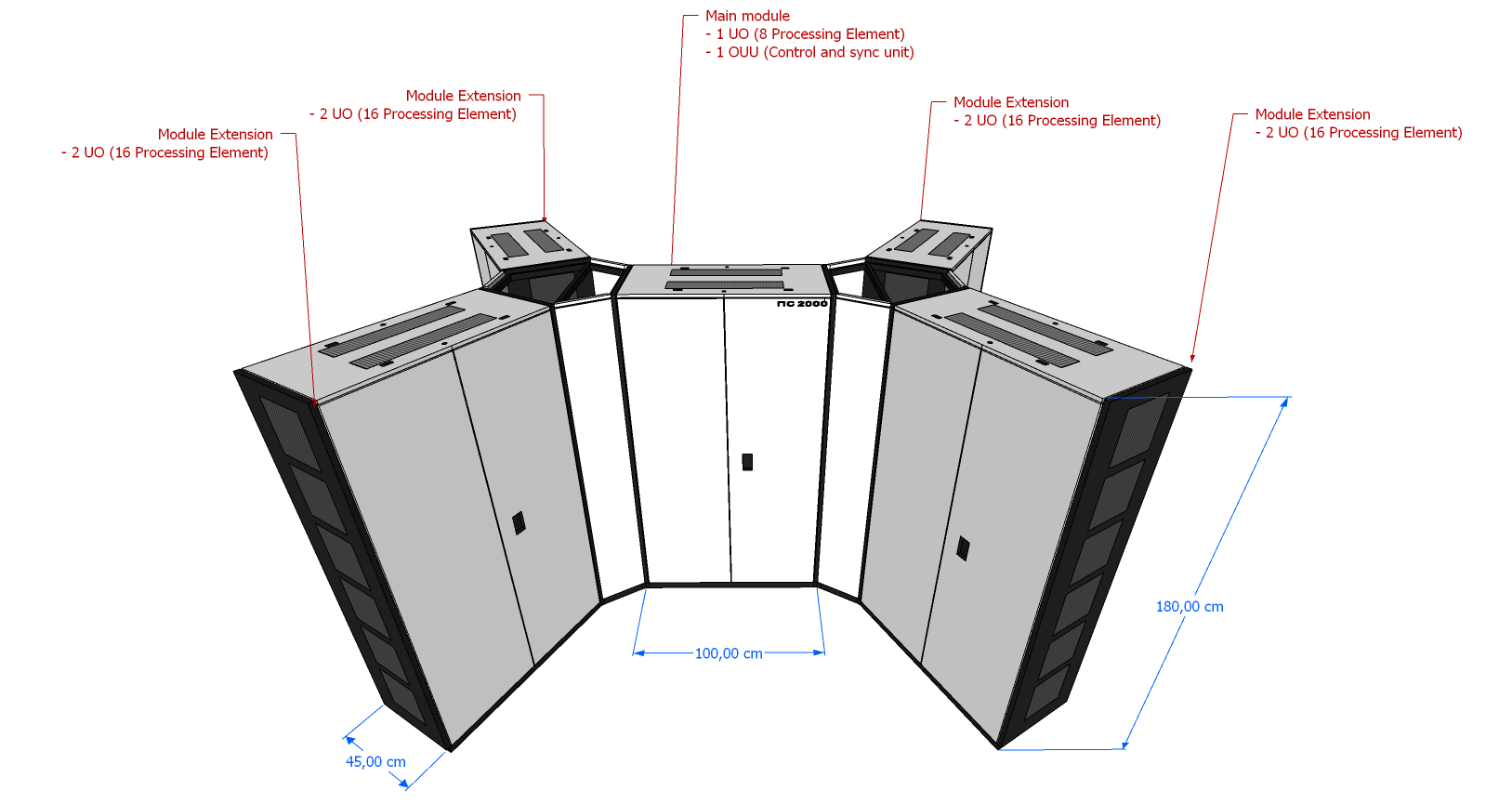

Design
- Manufacturer: Institute of Control Problems and the Impul's Scientific Production Association
- Designer: Il’ya Itenberg, Vladislav Rezanov of Impul's and Iveri Prangishvili
- Release date: 1981; 45 years ago
- Units sold: 242
- Price: 800,000 Rbls

Casing
- Dimensions: 100 cm x 45 cm x 180 cm per cabinet.

System
- CPU: 8 to 64 24-bit processing element @ 3 MHz
- Memory: Up to 3072 kilobytes (64 x 48 Kbits)
- MIPS: 200 MIPS
- FLOPS: 40 MFlops

The PS-2000 (ПС-2000, Russian: перенастраиваемая структура, reconfigurable system) was a Soviet supercomputer built in the 1980s.

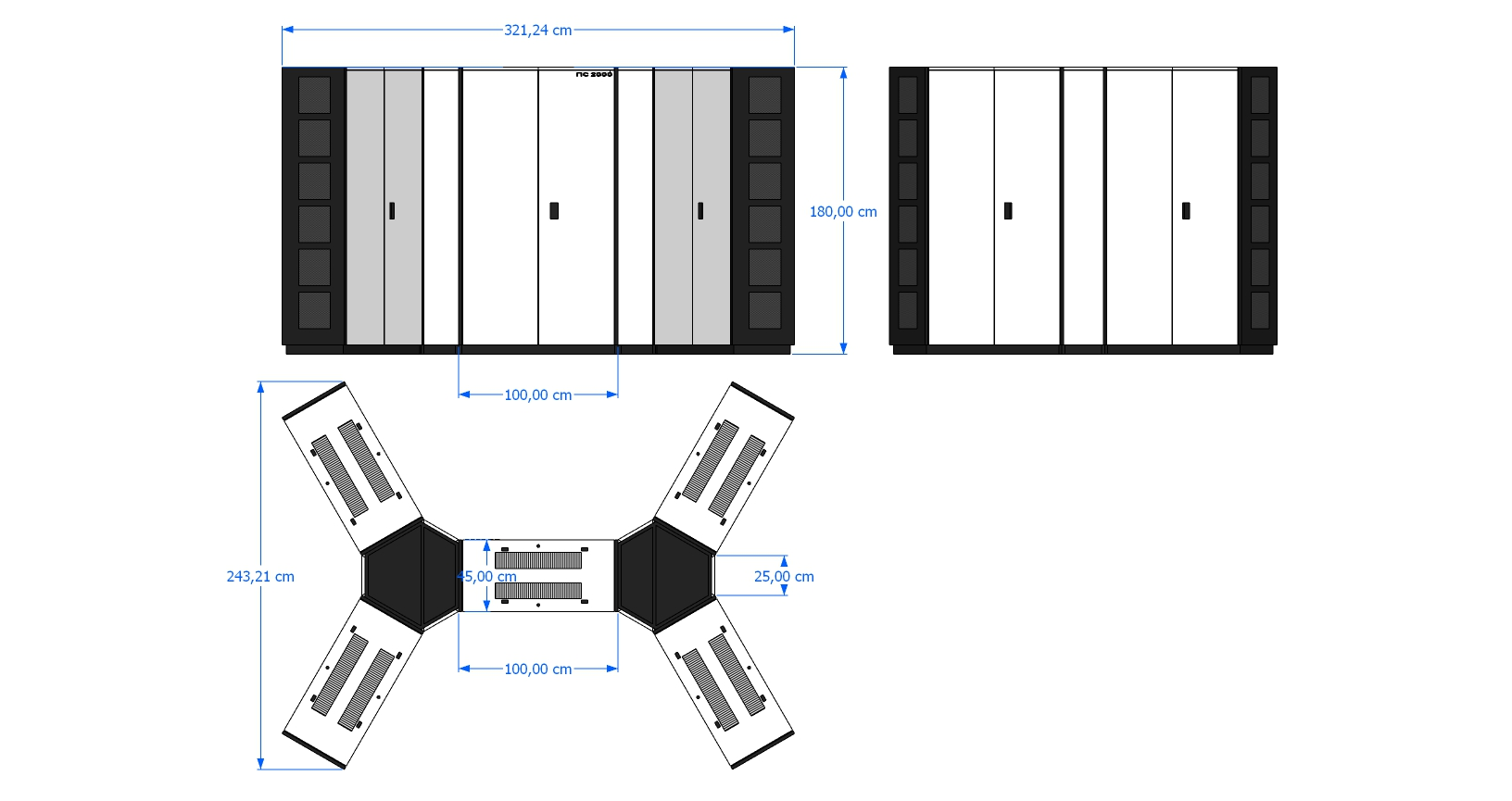
3-axes view of PS-2000

== History ==
In the middle of the 1970s, it appeared, in the USSR, that the computing power available to process geophysics data, real-time space probes data, mineral prospecting, weather forecast, etc. was far to be sufficient, and that a new class of supercomputers, hundreds of times more powerful than the existing installed systems, was needed.

The development of ПС-2000 began in 1978, as a joint project between the Institute of Control Problems (IPU) in Moscow and the Impul's Scientific Production Association in Severodonetsk, under the supervision of Il’ya Itenberg and Vladislav Rezanov of Impul's and Iveri Prangishvili of IPU. The computer entered production in 1981, and was manufactured in various configurations until 1988.

During the 1980s and the 1990s, the Roscosmos mission control computing complex was organized around an Elbrus 2 supercomputer, with a PS-2000 as a front-processing supercomputer for telemetry data.

== Architecture ==
The PS-2000 is a SIMD-type supercomputer.

It consists of 8 to 64 processing element (PE), cadenced at 3 MHz, that are connected to each other, under the control of a common command unit (OUU), and connected each to 12 or 48 KB of memory. Eight processing elements are grouped in a processing device (UO).

Each PE use 24-bit registers, in fixed or floating-point format. An addition takes 0.96 μs and a multiplication takes 1.6 μs, allowing theoretic peak performances of 200 MIPS for a full configuration system.

The computer is formed from 3 cabinets types:

- Base module : one UO and one OUU
- Extension module 1 : one UO (8 PE)
- Extension module 2 : two UO (16 PE)

In the simplest configuration, the supercomputer consists of only one cabinet. In the full configuration, with 8 UO, the supercomputer consists of 5 cabinets, organised in a double-Y shape.
