= Iskra-1030 =

Soviet computer model

Iskra 1030
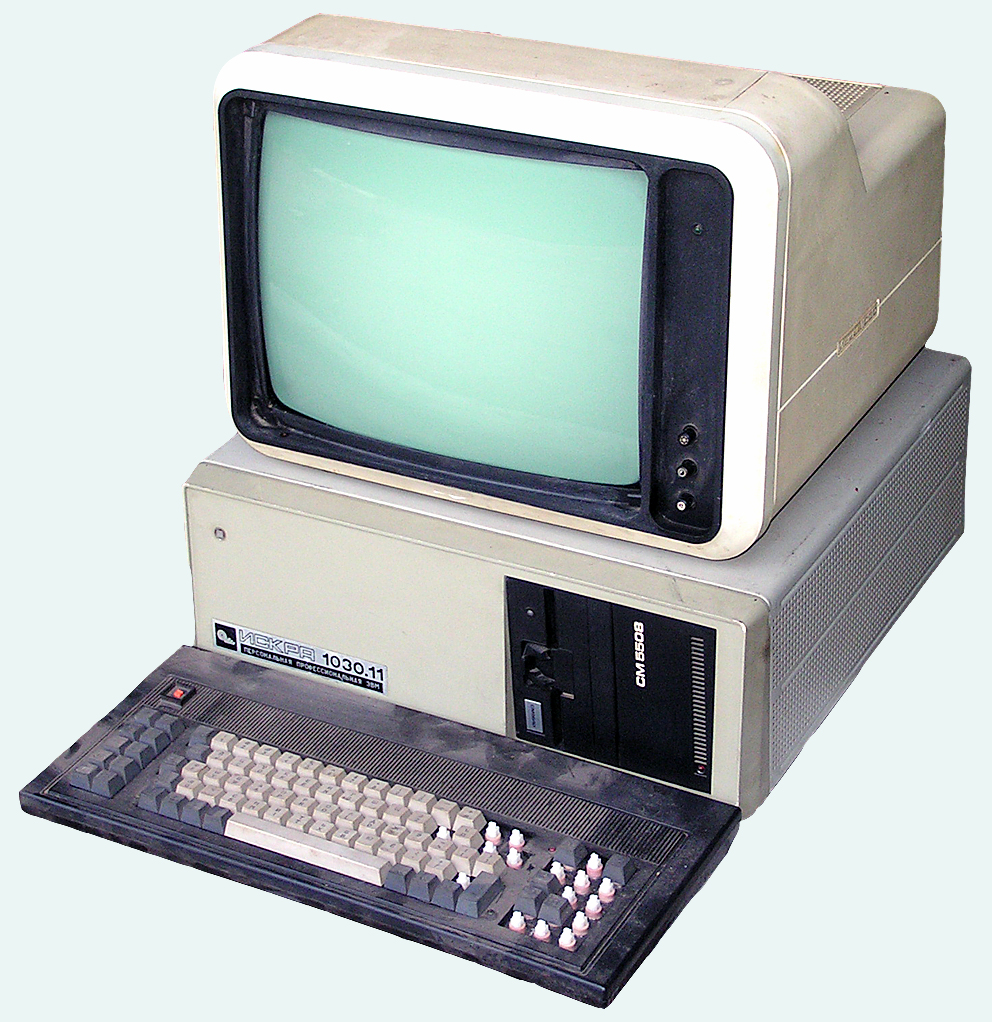
- Искра 1030.11
- Developer: Elektronmash in Leningrad
- Manufacturer: Iskra factory in Smolensk and Shchyotmash factory in Kursk
- Released: 1989; 37 years ago
- Operating system: ADOS (Russian DOS, compatible with MS-DOS/PC DOS 2.x and 3.x), MS-DOS, CP/M-86
- CPU: K1810VM86 (Intel 8086 clone) @ 4.77 MHz
- Memory: 640 KB
- Storage: Hard disk drive: 10 or 20 MB
- Removable storage: Floppy disk drive: 1×720 KB
- Display: Color CGA compatible

The Iskra 1030 (Russian: Искра 1030) was an Intel 8086 compatible personal computer produced in the USSR. It was designed by Elektronmash (Russian: ЛНПО «Электронмаш») in Leningrad. The main manufacturers were the Iskra factory (Russian: Искра) in Smolensk and the Shchyotmash factory (Russian: Счётмаш) in Kursk. The model line consisted of Iskra 1030.11 (basic), Iskra 1030М (modified), Iskra 1031, and Iskra 3104.

== Specification ==
The Iskra 1030M produced from 1989 comprised:

- CPU: K1810VM86 (Russian: КР1810ВМ86, Intel 8086 clone), 4.77 MHz
- RAM: 640 KB
- Display: color CGA compatible
- Floppy disk drive: 1×720 KB
- Hard disk drive: 20 MB
- Operating system: ADOS (Russian: АДОС; Russian DOS, compatible with MS-DOS/PC DOS 2.x and 3.x), MS-DOS, CP/M-86
- Release Date: 1989
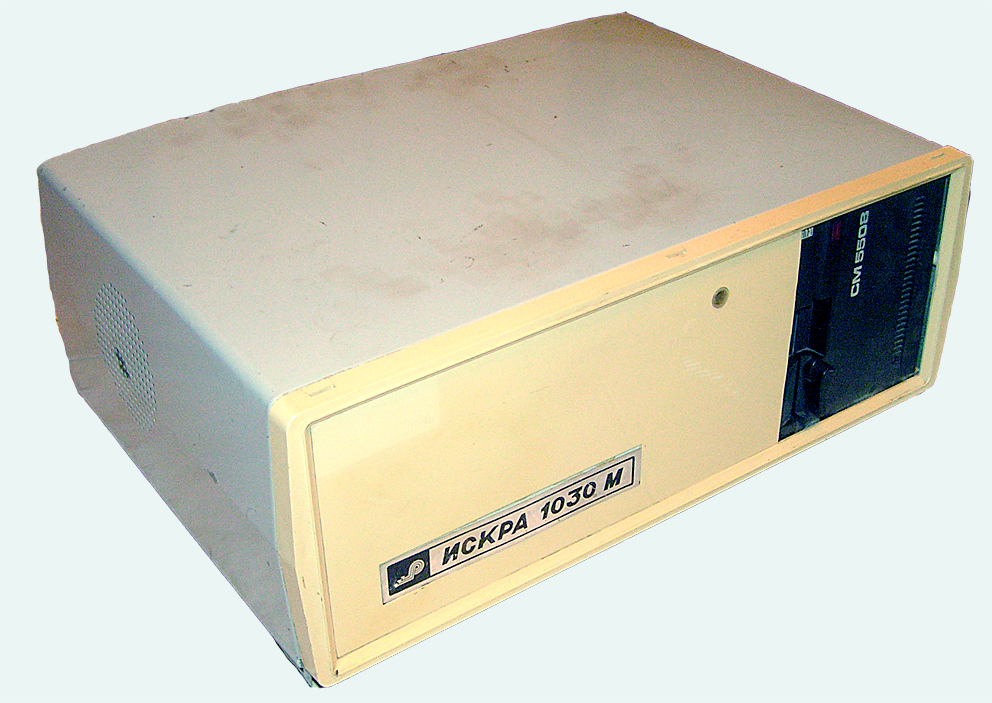
Искра 1030М

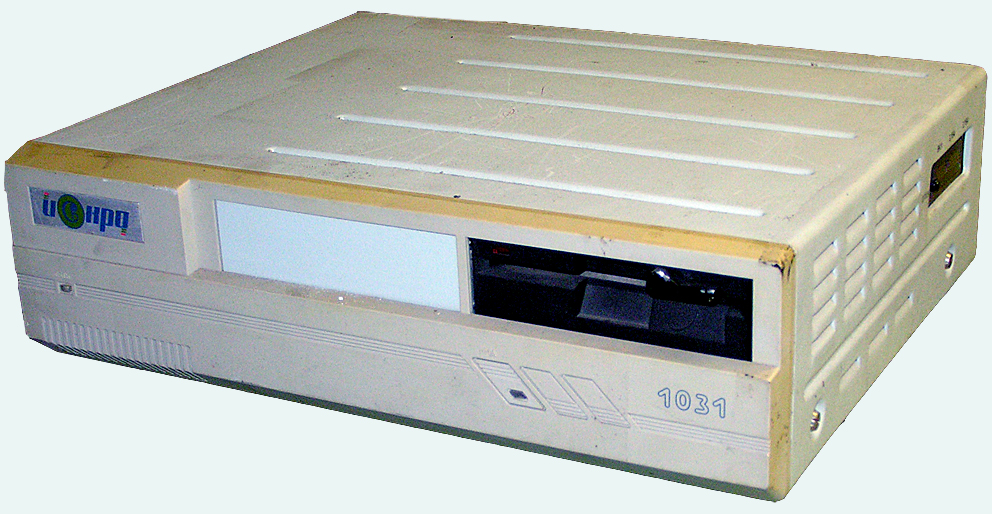
Искра 1031

== Software ==
The computer was shipped with ADOS, a Russian version of MS-DOS/PC DOS 2.x and 3.x, a BASIC interpreter, the special language and interpreter for accounting calculations YAMB (Russian: ЯМБ, Язык машин бухгалтерских), the text editor R1. The operating system used the main code page, hardwired into the display ROM; it was compatible neither with CP 866 nor CP 855, although partially with ISO/IEC 8859-5.

== See also ==
- ES PEVM
