= DNA-OS =

DNA-OS is a French-made operating system to supersede MutekA, an obsolete operating system, while still providing POSIX thread API. As said on the SoCLib website, "It is a kernel-mode lightweight operating system for Multiprocessor System on a Chip. It is built on top of a thin HAL to ease porting on new platforms and processor architecture. DNA/OS does not support virtual memory."

DNA-OS is a layered microkernel operating system, written in C99, released under the GNU GPLv3 license.

== Target hardware / software ==
- ARM7, ARM9, Cortex A8/A9
- MIPS
- Micro Blaze
- SparcV8
- NiOS

== OS flavours ==
- SMP (Symmetric multiprocessing)
- DS (Distributed Scheduling)

== Associated libraries ==
- Native POSIX Threads
- Newlibc
