= Besta (computer) =

Computer

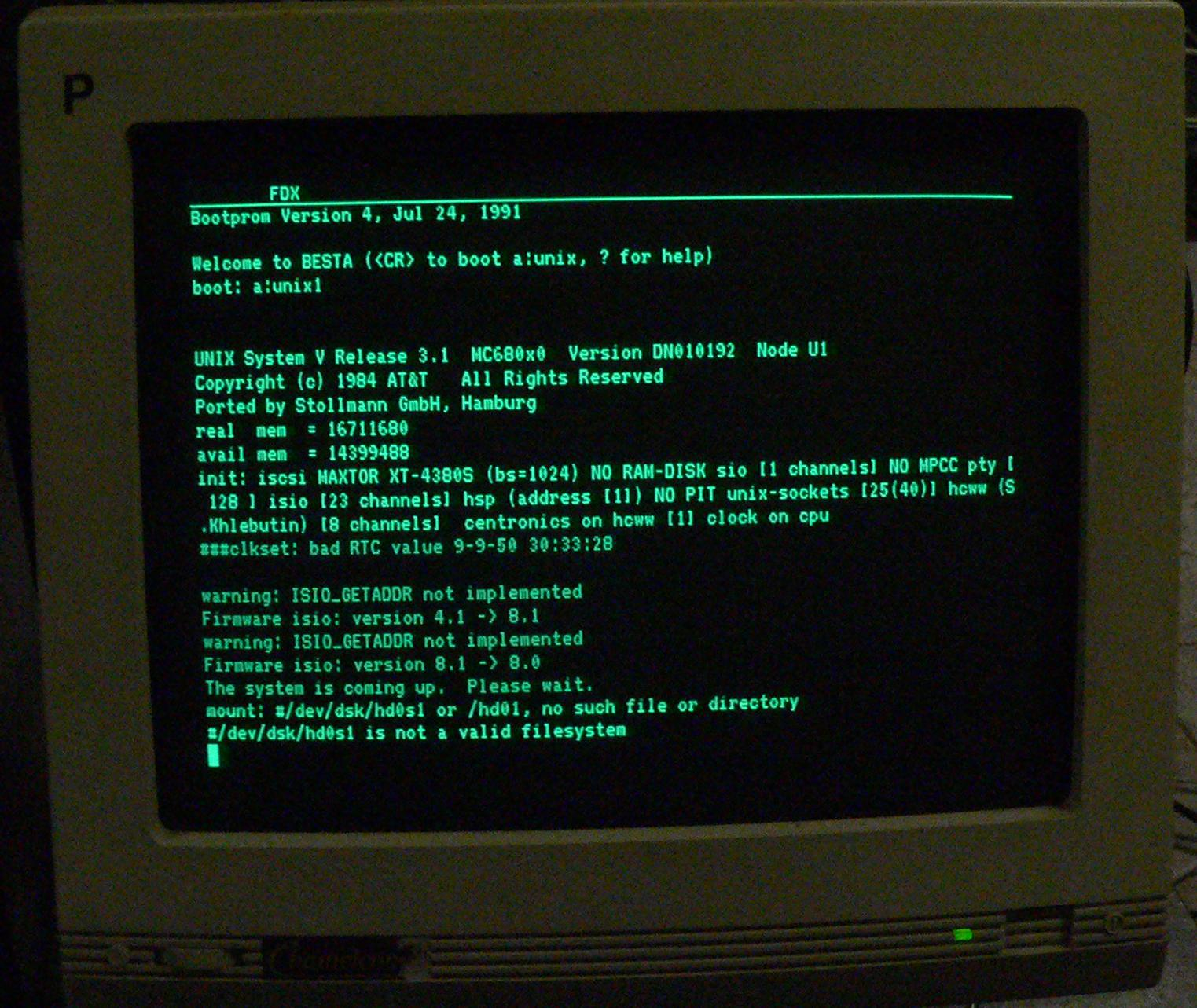
- Boot screen
- Released: 1988; 38 years ago
- Units sold: More than 1,000
- Operating system: Bestix
- CPU: Motorola 68020

Besta (Беста) is a Soviet Unix-based graphics workstation. Starting in 1988, more than 1,000 were produced. It was produced primarily for use in the Novovoronezh Nuclear Power Plant and some universities. The workstation was designed by students of the Moscow State University in concert with the Scientific Research Institute of System Development. Uniquely, the hardware was manufactured at the ZiL plant, which was better known for producing automotive vehicles and heavy equipment.

There were several versions of the computer. Besta-88 has a Motorola 68020 CPU and VME bus.

The Bestix operating system is a legally ported version of AT&T UNIX System V Release 3.2.
