= Poisk (computer) =

1989 Soviet personal computer

Poisk (Поиск)
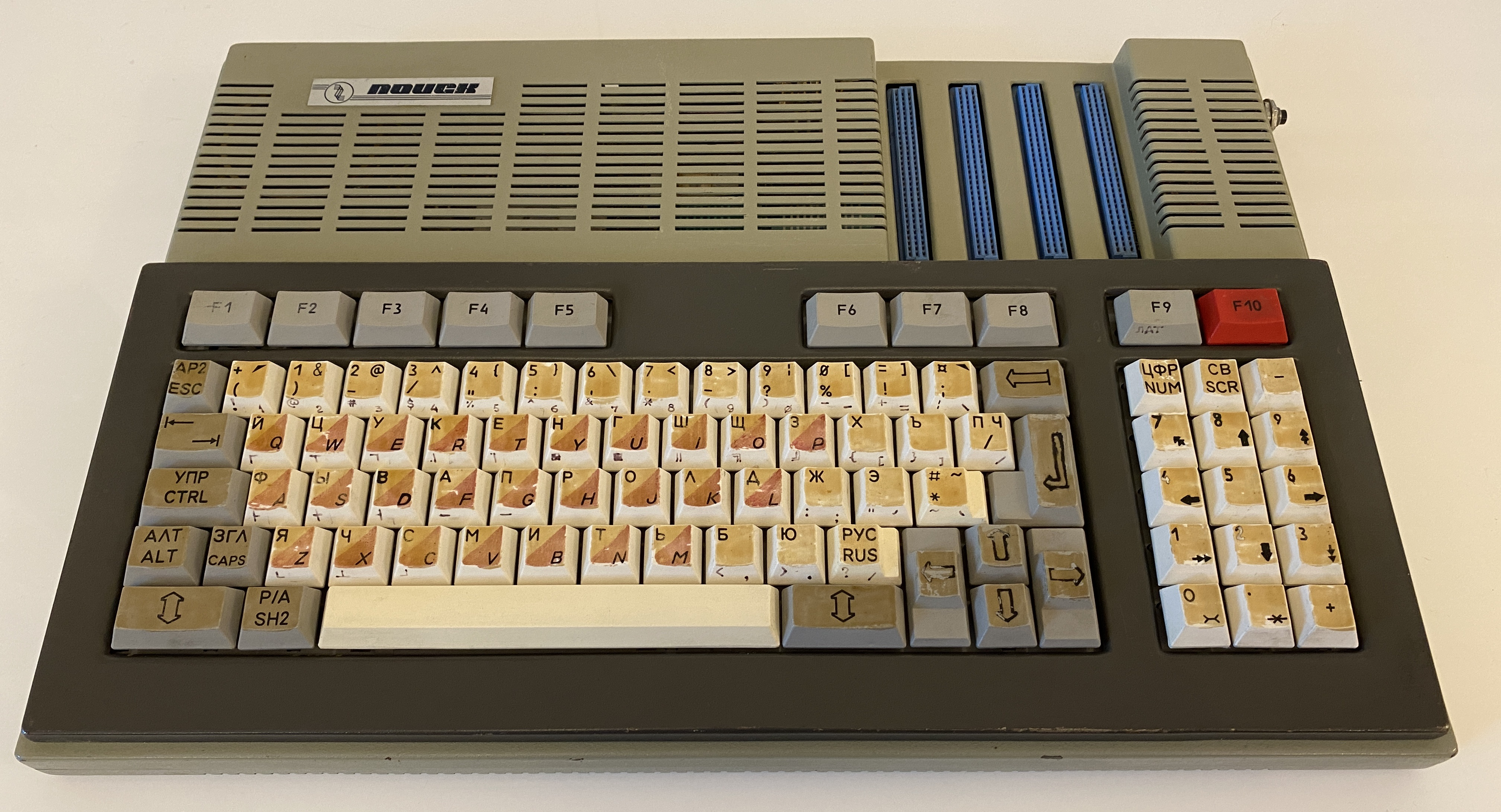
- Poisk
- Manufacturer: KPO Electronmash
- Type: Home computer
- Released: 1989; 37 years ago
- CPU: K1810VM88 (Intel 8088 clone) @ 5 Mhz
- Memory: 128 or 512 KB
- Display: 320x200; 640x200; 4 or 2 colors
- Graphics: CGA
- Sound: PC speaker

Poisk (Russian: Поиск, "The Search") is an IBM-compatible computer built by KPO Electronmash (НПО «Электронмаш») in Kiev, Ukrainian SSR during the Soviet era. It is based on the K1810VM88 microprocessor, a clone of the Intel 8088. Developed since 1987 and released in 1989, it was the most common IBM-compatible computer in the Soviet Union.

The basic version did not include an expansion module for parallel or serial ports for connecting a printer, mouse or other devices. The computer had 128 KB (hardware versions 1.0, 1.01, 1.02, 1.03 and 1.05) or 512 KB of RAM (versions 1.04 and 1.06), and displayed CGA graphics.

Unusual for an IBM-compatible computer, Poisk utilities cartridges for expanding the system's capabilities in lieu of traditional internal expansion slots found in most similar systems.

Despite using CGA-like graphical video modes and 8088-compatible processor running at 5 Mhz, it was not fully IBM-compatible, lacking the Motorola 6845 display and the Intel 8237 DMA controllers, and its performance lagged behind the IBM XT due to the emulation of the alphanumeric modes using NMI and sharing RAM between CPU and display.

There were three versions of this computer: Poisk, Poisk-2 and Poisk-3. The machine entered mass production in 1991, just before the Soviet collapse, and production output in the early 1990s reached several tens of thousands units a year.

== Technical details ==
=== Poisk ===
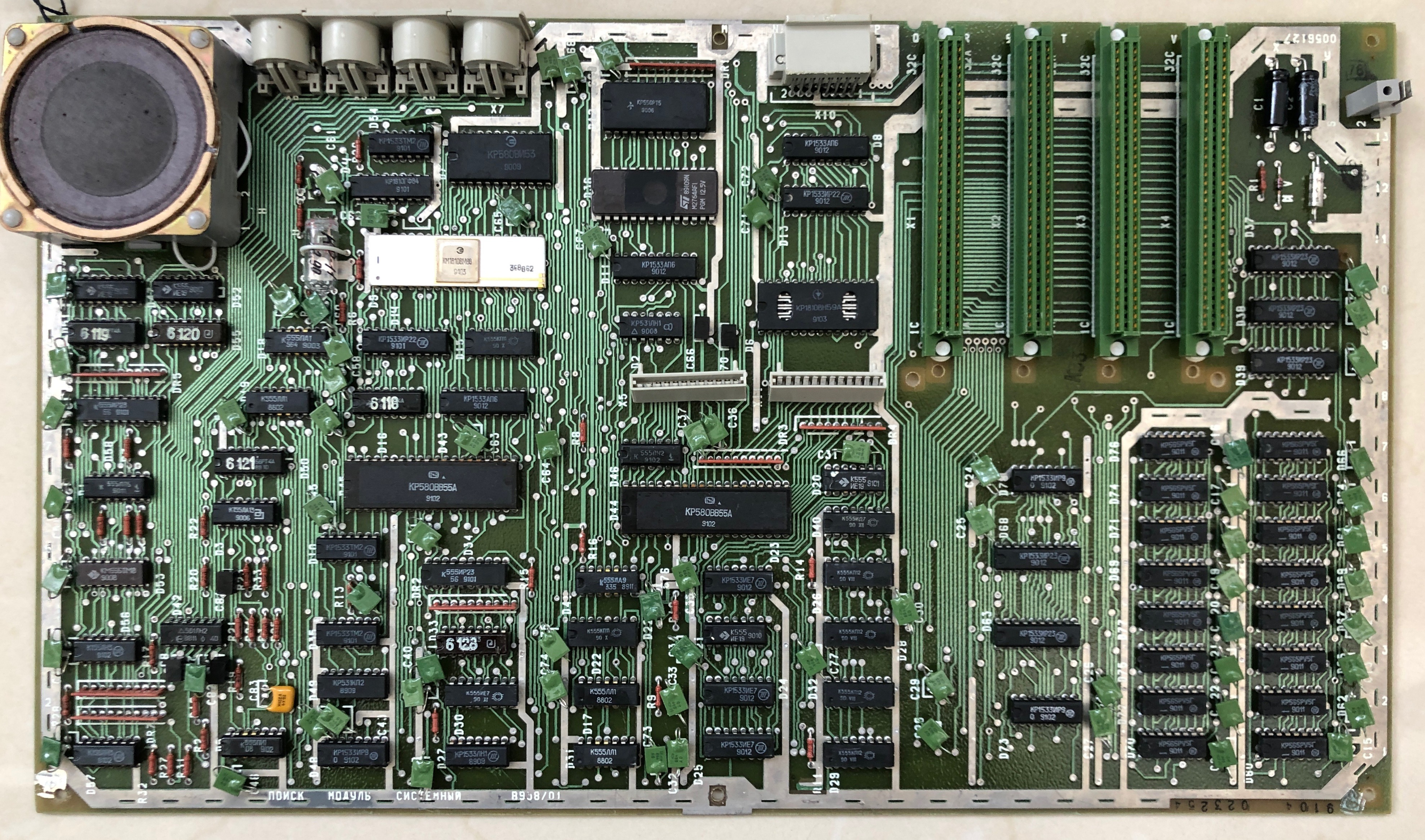
Poisk motherboard

The Poisk was made as cheap as possible, being a monoblock with a motherboard and keyboard and an external power supply.

The machine came with a KM1810VM88 processor. The CPU speed was 5.0 MHz and the machine came with 128 KB (models 1.0, 1.01, 1.02, 1.03 and 1.05) or 512 KB of RAM (models 1.04 and 1.06), a CGA compatible video adapter and four expansion slots. A monitor and tape recorder could be connected directly to the computer.

=== Poisk-2 ===
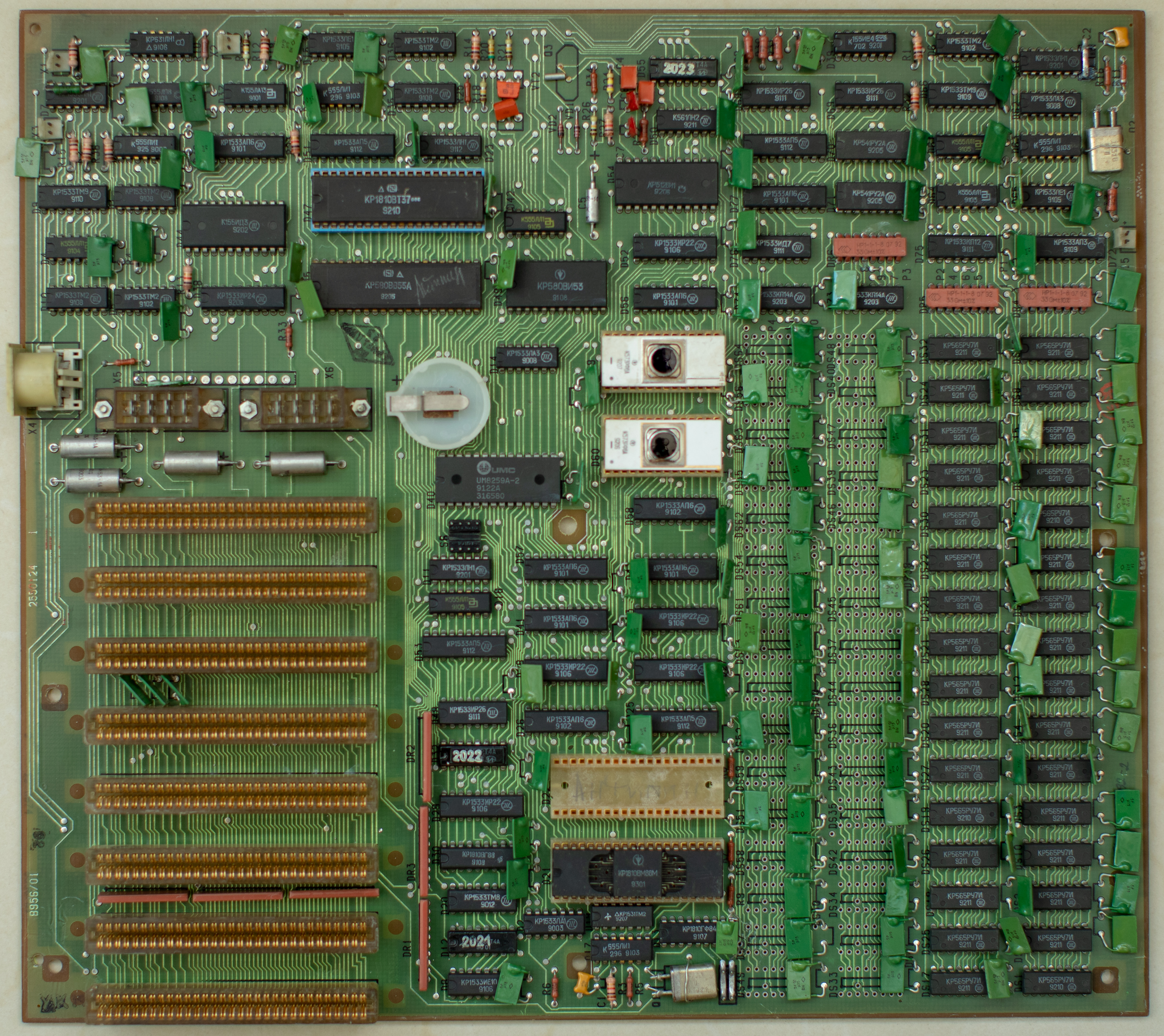
Poisk-2 motherboard

Poisk-2 was compatible with the PC/XT architecture on software and hardware level.

The machine came with a KR1810VM86M processor with the possibility of adding a K1810VM87B coprocessor. The CPU speed was 8 MHz and the machine came with 640 KB of RAM (expandable to 2048 KB), an Hercules and Extended CGA video adapter, hard and floppy disk controller based on i82064 and i8272 chips and COM and printer ports.

=== Poisk-3 ===
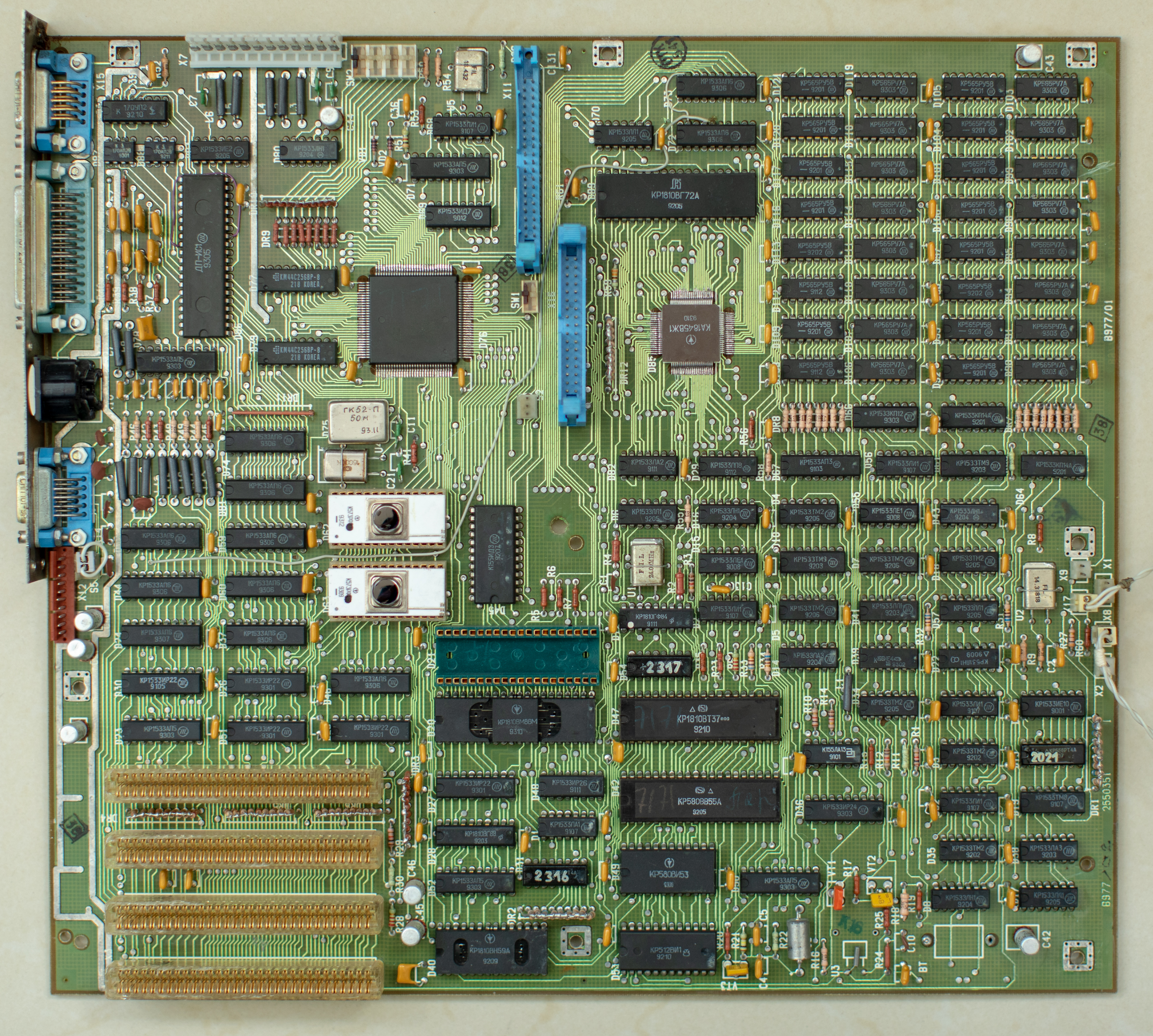
Poisk-3 motherboard

Poisk-3 reduced manufacturing costs due to the use of high-integration microcircuits instead of discrete logic. It was produced in small batches in the early 1990s.

The machine came with a K1810VM86M processor with the possibility of adding a K1810VM87B coprocessor, or with a Intel 8086-2. The CPU speed was 8 MHz and the machine came with 640 KB of RAM, an EGA video adapter and an IDE HDD controller.
