= Elektronika MS 1504 =

Soviet laptop, 1991–1993

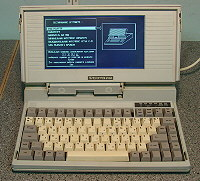
- Electronika MS 1504 in operation
- Codename: PK-300
- Also known as: PK-300
- Developer: Nemiga Design Bureau
- Manufacturer: NPO Integral Scientific Production Association
- Type: Laptop computer
- Released: 1991; 35 years ago
- Introductory price: USD 550 (as of March 1992)
- Discontinued: 1993
- Operating system: MS DOS 3.2/3.3
- CPU: KR1834VM86 (Intel i80C86 compatible) @ 4.77 MHz; 7.16 MHz (Turbo mode)
- Memory: 640 KB
- Storage: 5.2", 3.5" floppy disk or 10MB HDD
- Display: LCD – 640 x 200
- Power: 9V, 30W
- Dimensions: 306 mm × 312 mm × 68 mm (12.0 in × 12.3 in × 2.7 in)
- Weight: 6 kg (with batteries)

Elektronika MS 1504 (Russian: Электроника МС 1504), initially called PK-300, was the first laptop computer to be manufactured in the Soviet Union, BSSR, then in Belarus, after the collapse of USSR. Developed in 1986-1990 by Nemiga Design Bureau, it was produced by the "NPO Integral" Scientific Production Association in 1991-1993, its prototype was Toshiba T1100 Plus.

== Technical specifications ==
- Compatibility: IBM PC/XT
- Central processor: Integrated KR1834VM86 (DL-24A, Intel i80C86 compatible) at a clock frequency of 4.77 MHz and 7.16 MHz in Turbo mode
- Processor bit depth: 16 bit
- Data bus width: 8 bits
- Memory: RAM - 640 KB, VT-34 RAM Controller consists of 20 KR565RU11D microcircuits; ROM - 32 KB
- Storage: 5.2", 3.5" FDD or 10MB HDD
- Video controller: CGA (640 × 200 pixels in 4 shades of gray, or 80 × 25 characters text resolution)
- Display: domestic IZhG93-640x200 LCD matrix
- Operation System: MS DOS 3.2/3.3
- BIOS: Russian
- Dimensions: 306x312x68 mm
- Gross weight: 6 kg (with batteries)
- Power supply: 5V Nickel-Cadmium battery or 220V/50Hz via extrernal AC power supply

== Interfaces ==
- Parallel interface: IRPR-M/IEEE-1284 according to GOST 27942-88 (Centronics)
- Serial interface: C2 joint according to GOST 18145-81 (RS-232)
- Interface for connecting an external multi-color monitor according to GOST 28406-89 (RGB)
- Interface for connecting an external single-color monitor according to GOST 28406-89 (VIDEO/NTSC)
- Possibility of connecting an external 5.25" drive with a capacity of 360 KB
- Controller for two 3.5" or 5.2" disk drives with a capacity of 720 KB (3.5") and 360KB (5.2") each

== Modifications ==
There were three computer modifications: with a domestic display module based on the IZhG93-640x200 LCD matrix manufactured by the Saratov electronic equipment manufacturing plant "Reflector", as well as with compatible display modules from Toshiba and Citizen. Each of these modifications had two versions: with a display without backlighting (green screen - black characters) and with backlighting (blue screen - white characters), both with adjustable contrast. Externally, the backlit version was distinguished by a thicker cover and a smaller screen diagonal.

== Models ==
- PK-300
- PK-310 - PK-300 modification with a HDD.

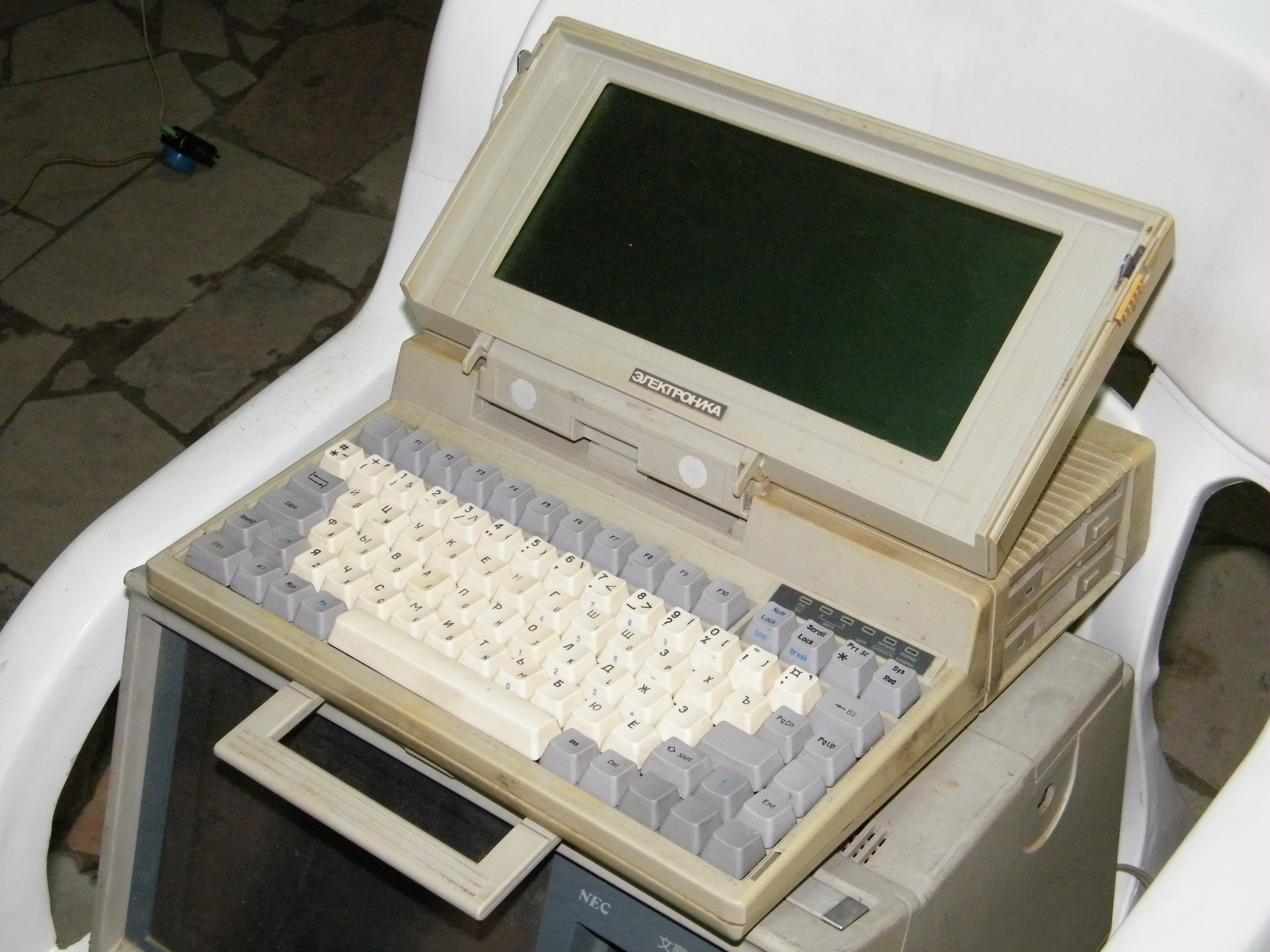
