= ACC Micro =

ACC Microelectronics Corporation
- Trade name: ACC Micro; Auctor Corporation
- Type: Private
- Industry: Semiconductor
- Founded: February 1987; 39 years ago in Santa Clara, California, United States
- Founder: Wei-Tau Chiang
- Defunct: 2003; 23 years ago
- Fate: Dissolved
- Website: accmircro.com (archived)

ACC Microelectronics Corporation, commonly abbreviated to ACC Micro and later Auctor Corporation, was an American semiconductor company active from 1987 to 2003 and based in Santa Clara, California. A fabless manufacturer of VLSI chips, ACC Micro primarily produced chipsets for x86 personal computers over the span of two decades. It was the first company to produce a single-chip chipset for the production of compatibles based on the IBM Personal Computer AT, eclipsing companies such as Chips and Technologies who produced the four-chip NEAT chipset. It was also one of the first companies to produce chipsets based on IBM's Micro Channel–based PS/2 computers.

== History ==
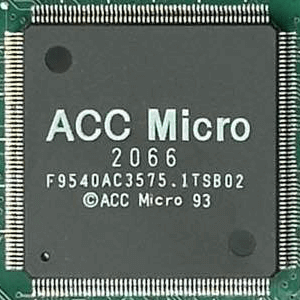
ACC-2066, ISA-based chipset for i486 systems, from 1993

ACC Microelectronics was founded in February 1987 in Santa Clara, California, by Wei-Tau "W. T." Chiang. Before founding ACC Micro, Chiang worked at Intel in Santa Clara, where he was one of the designers of the 16-bit 80286 processor launched in 1982 and the 32-bit i386 processor launched in 1985. Chiang privately financed the incorporation of ACC Micro, his first start-up as well as his break into VLSI design, in Santa Clara. ACC Micro was a fabless outfit, contracting Intel, Toshiba, and AMI Semiconductor for the production of its chips. Chiang instituted a strict six-month lead time for every chip that came out of ACC Micro, creating a high-pressure environment that nonetheless had normal turnover rate for an IC vendor. He sought workers with between 10 and 12 years of prior experience in the semiconductor industry; by January 1990, ACC had roughly 50 employees.

ACC launched its first products in April 1988 with ten different ICs, comprising both chipsets and controller chips. This inaugural lineup included chipsets that consolidated the support circuitry of the IBM PC XT, the PC AT, the PS/2 Model 30, as well as floppy controllers compatible with all three systems. In mid-1988, ACC began development of one of the first chipsets built around IBM's Micro Channel–based lineup of PS/2s, including the PS/2 Model 50, the Model 50 Z, and the Model 60 (the aforementioned Model 30 was based on the Industry Standard Architecture of the original IBM PC). This came to fruition in February 1989 with the release of the ACC-85000 chipset, which was also backwards-compatible with ISA, allowing for hybrid MCA–ISA computers to be built.

In April 1989, ACC Micro formed a strategic alliance with Motorola for the latter to become a second-source manufacturer as well as a reseller of ACC's AT-compatible chipsets. This decision came as a surprise to industry observers, as Motorola had previously been a fierce competitor to both IBM and Intel and their x86 platform (the IBM PC and PS/2 being examples of x86 systems) with microprocessor families such as the Motorola 680x0. Motorola paid ACC an undisclosed sum in exchange for licensing its chip designs for Motorola to manufacture and rebrand under its own name. This contract also included a co-designing agreement, with Motorola helping ACC redesign the silicon to fit the 1 μm process (down from ACC's previous 1.5 μm process) while allowing ACC to continue its relationships with its fabricators for ACC's own branded chips.

In May 1990, ACC became the first company to produce a single-chip chipset for the production of compatibles based on the IBM PC AT with the release of the ACC-2036. The single-chip chipset included cores compatible with the Intel 8237 DMA controller, the Intel 8259 interrupt controller, the Intel 8254 timer–counter, the Intel 82284 clock generator, and the Intel 82288 bus controller. This development let ACC eclipse companies such as Chips and Technologies, who produced the four-chip NEAT chipset, and allowed manufactures of notebook computers to produce inexpensive i386SX-based machines for the first time.

ACC found itself falling behind in technology in the mid-1990s; despite being consistently profitable for three years and netting $50 million in sales in fiscal year 1995, the company scrambled to design its first chipset compatible with Intel's Peripheral Component Interconnect (PCI) bus—by then a three-year-old bus standard—in late 1995. Around the same time, it made its first and only acquisition of a company, a designer of PC Card I/O chips, and floated the idea of going public on the stock market. ACC by this point had shed Toshiba, Intel, and Motorola as fabricators, instead relying on TSMC of Taiwan and Seiko Epson of Japan, with the president of Epson having joined ACC's board of directors not long after the two companies established a working relationship. In 1996, ACC invested an undisclosed amount into the raising of a silicon wafer manufacturing facility in San Jose, to be named Silicon Valley Semiconductor Corporation, joined by several other Taiwanese semiconductor companies; the deal ultimately collapsed with no plant ever built.

In the late 1990s, ACC Micro began trading as Auctor Corporation. It stopped updating its website in 2003 and went defunct shortly thereafter.
