= Intel 8089 =

Microprocessor

Pinout of Intel 8089

The Intel 8089 input/output coprocessor was available for use with the 8086/8088 central processor. It was announced in May 1979, but the price was not available at that time. It used the same programming technique as 8087 for input/output operations, such as transfer of data from memory to a peripheral device, and so reducing the load on the CPU. This I/O processor was available in July 1979 for US$194.20 in quantities of 100 or more. Intel second sourced this coprocessor to Fujitsu Limited.

Because IBM didn't use it in the IBM PC design, it did not become well known; later Intel I/O coprocessors did not keep the x89 designation the way math coprocessors kept the x87 designation. It was used in the Apricot PC and the Intel Multibus iSBC-215 Hard disk drive controller. It was also used in the Altos 586 multi-user computer. Intel themselves used the 8089 in their reference designs (which they also commercialized) as System 86.

== Peripherals ==
- Intel 8282/8283: 8-bit latch
- Intel 8284: clock generator
- Intel 8286 / 8287 were 8-bit data bus transceivers. Both Intel I8286 and I8287(inverting version) were available for US$16.25 in quantities of 100.
- Intel 8288: bus controller
- Intel 8289: bus arbiter

== Literature and datasheets ==
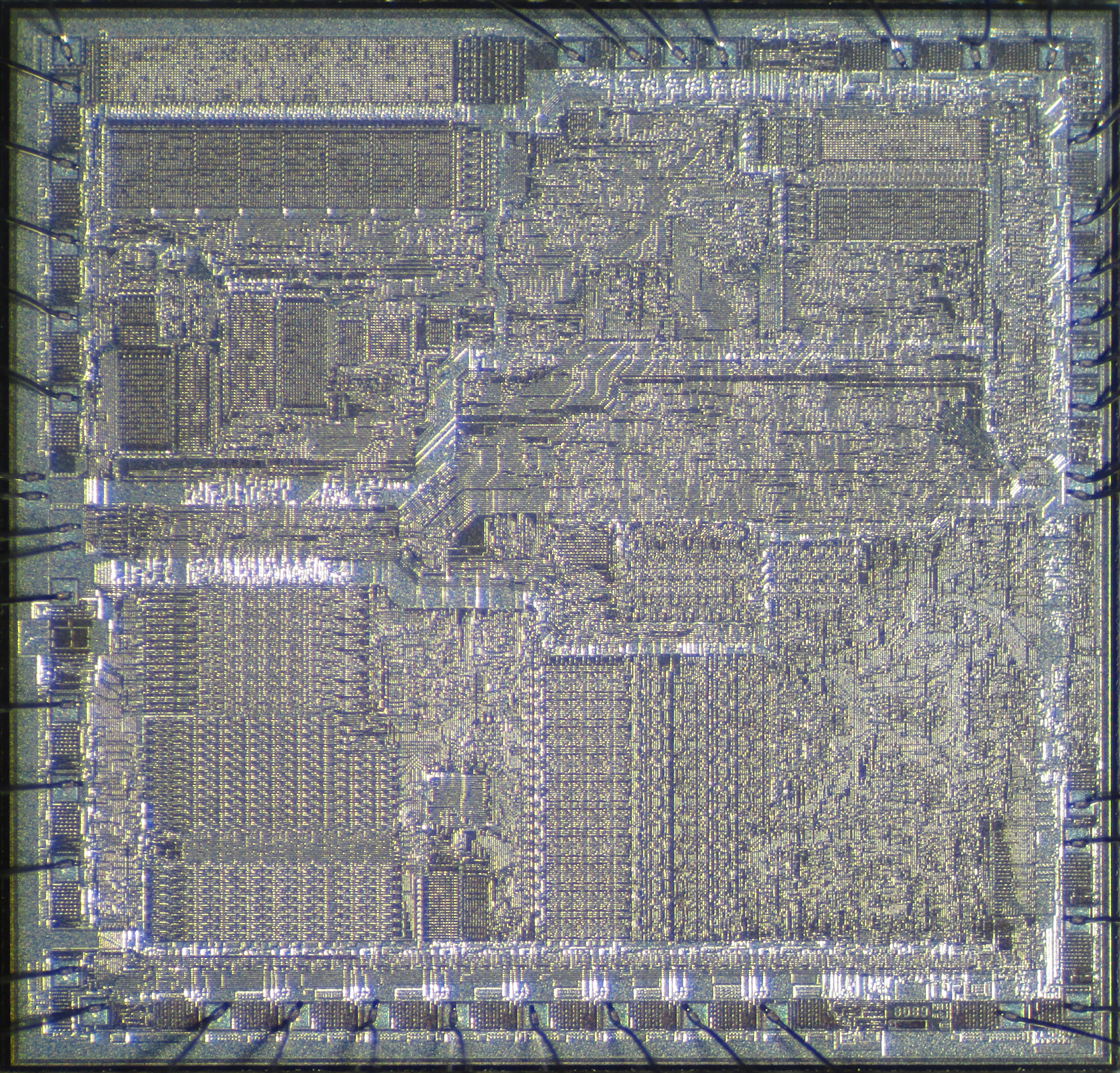
Die shot of Intel 8089

- 8089 Assembler Users Guide; Intel 1979
- 8089 8 & 16-Bit HMOS I/O Processor; Intel 1980
- John Atwood, Dave Ferguson: Debugging Strategies And Considerations For 8089 Systems, Application Note (AP-50), September 1979, Intel Corporation.
- Jim Nadir: Designing 8086, 8088, 8089 Multiprocessing System With The 8289 Bus Arbiter, Application Note (AP-51), März 1979, Intel Corporation.
- Robin Jigour: Prototyping with the 8089 I/O Processor, Application Note (AP-89), Mai 1980, Order number AFN 01153A, Intel Corporation.
- Hard Disk Controller Design Using the 8089, Application Note (AP-122), Order number 210202-001, Intel Corporation.
- Graphic CRT Design Using the Intel 8089, Application Note (AP-123), Intel Corporation.
