= Chips and Technologies =

American semiconductor company

Chips and Technologies, Inc.
- Industry: Semiconductors
- Founded: December 1984; 41 years ago
- Founders: Gordon A. Campbell; Dado Banatao
- Defunct: 1997; 29 years ago
- Fate: Acquired by Intel
- Headquarters: Milpitas, California, United States
- Website: chips.com at the Wayback Machine (archived 1997-07-08)

Chips and Technologies, Inc. (C&T), was an early fabless semiconductor company founded in Milpitas, California, in December 1984 by Gordon A. Campbell and Dado Banatao.

Its first product, announced September 1985, was a four chip EGA chipset that handled the functions of 19 of IBM's proprietary chips on the Enhanced Graphics Adapter. By that November's COMDEX, more than a half dozen companies had introduced EGA-compatible boards based on C&T's chipset. This was followed by chipsets for PC motherboards and other computer graphics chips.

C&T was acquired by Intel in 1997, primarily for its graphics chip business.

Former members of C&T founded Asiliant Technologies in January 2000 to continue the support of the CHIPS 65545, 65550, 65555, 69000, 69030, and other notebook and LCD oriented graphics ICs. Intel licensed the rights to build, sell, and service the C&T chips to Asiliant. Asiliant manufactured and sold C&T components for the next few years until it closed.

== x86 products ==
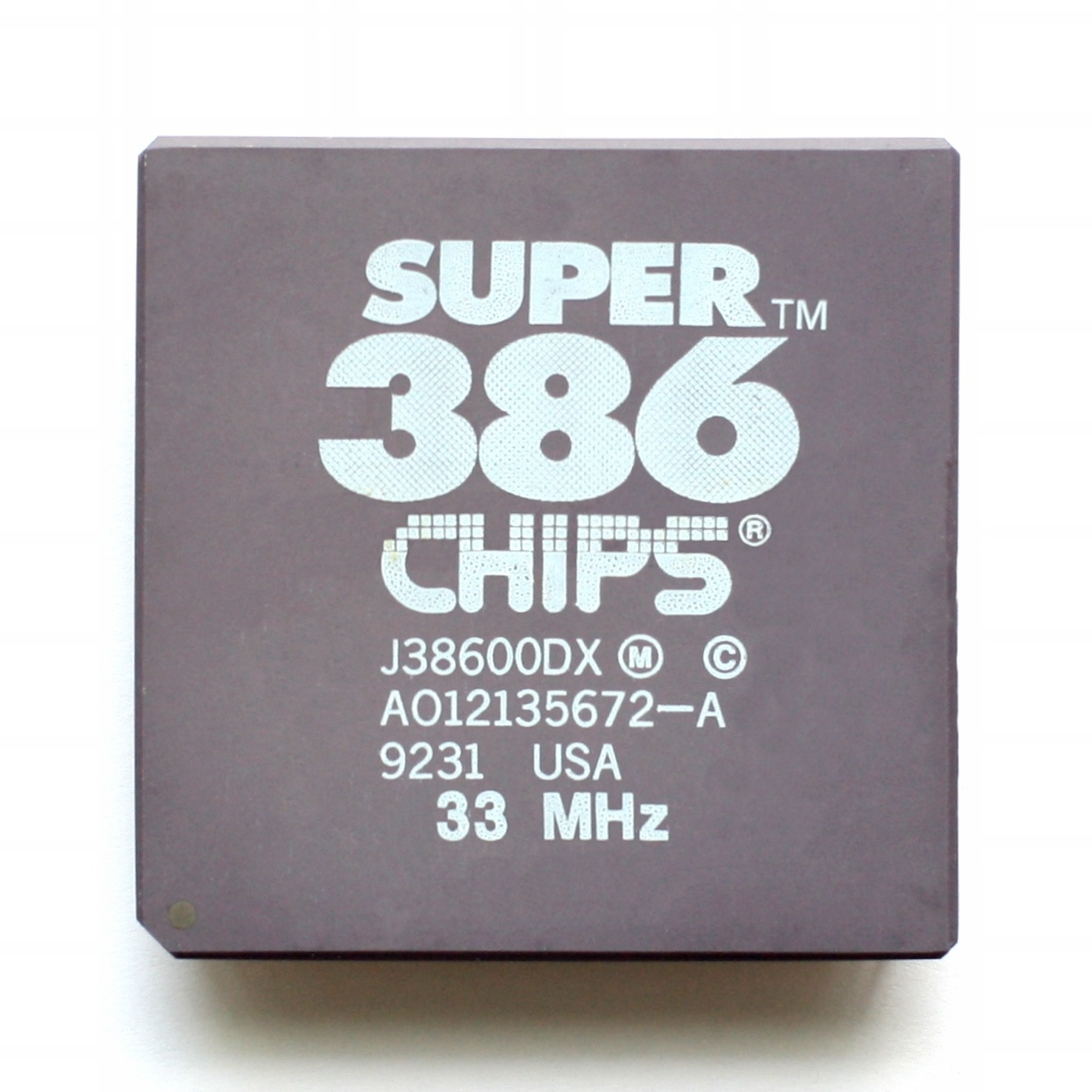
Super386

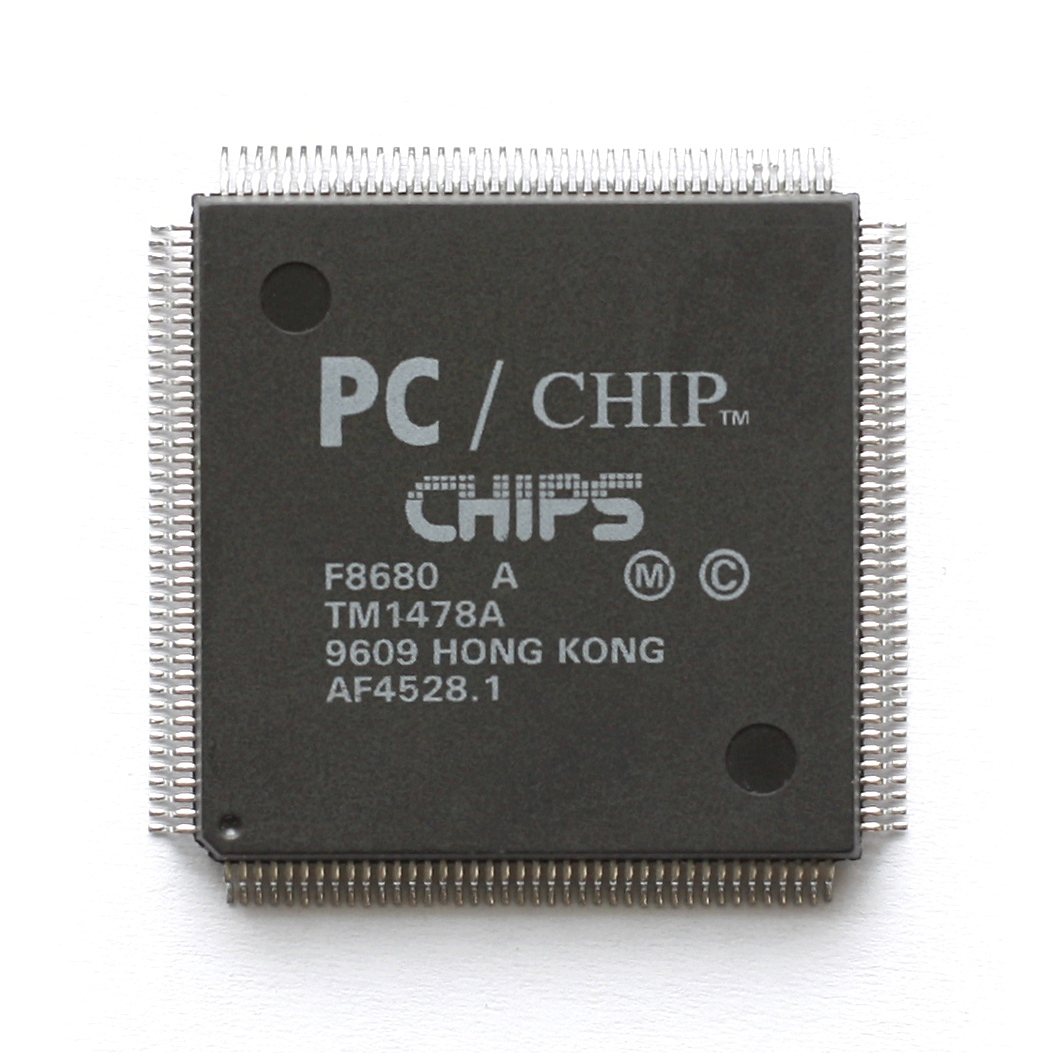
F8680, a x86 compatible SoC.

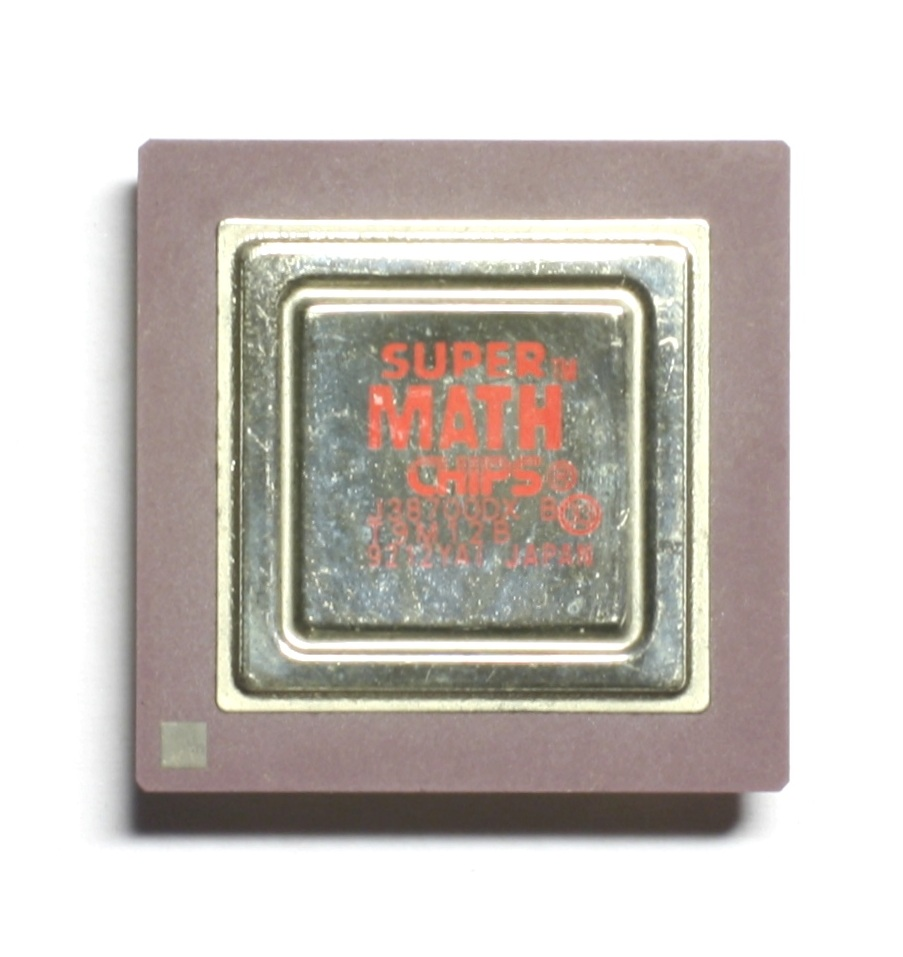
SuperMath J38700DX

C&T SuperMath J38700DX was an 80387DX compatible FPU coprocessor.

C&T also designed a 386-compatible microprocessor known as the Super386 38600DX/38600SX using clean room design techniques, but this chip never enjoyed as much success as the 386 CPUs produced by Intel, AMD, and Cyrix. C&T 38605DX had 512 byte cache, but the 144 pin PGA package was incompatible with 386 socket.

== Motherboard chips and chipsets ==
- 82C100 - IBM PS/2 Model 30 and Super XT Computer Chip - Released in 1987, compatible with 8086, 80C86, V30, 8088, 80C88, V20 CPUs. Compatible with all PC/XT functional units: 8284, 8288, 8237, 8259, 8254, 8255, DRAM controller, SRAM controller, Keyboard controller, Parity Generation and Configuration registers. Additionally features EMS control, dual clock and power management. It supports up to 2.5 MB RAM.
- 82C206 chip, introduced by C&T in 1986 and the core of the NEAT (New Enhanced AT) chipset. This chip, like its predecessor the 82C100, provided equivalent functionality to the TTL chips on the PC/AT's mainboard, namely: the 82284 clock generator, the 82288 bus controller, the 8254 Programmable Interval Timer, the two 8259 Programmable Interrupt Controllers, the two 8237 DMA controllers, the MC146818 NVRAM/RTC chip.
- 82C235 - Single Chip AT (SCAT) - Released in 1989, compatible with PC/AT. Supported LIM EMS 4.0, up to 16 MB memory and Shadow RAM.
- 82C351, 82C355, 82C356 / CS82310 (PEAK DM) - A three chip successor to NEAT for 32-bit 386DX CPUs. The PEAK DM/386 chipset supports up to 128MB of RAM in eight banks (32MB in two banks most commonly implemented), and up to 256KB of direct-mapped L2 cache.
- 82C836 - Single Chip 386sx AT (SCATsx) - Compatible with PC/AT (bus), supported all the features of SCAT, added support for the i386SX processor and i387SX math coprocessor, and optional external L2 cache.

== Video chips ==
Chips and Technologies was the first company (outside of IBM) to deliver an EGA-compatible chipset. The Enhanced Graphics CHIPSet consisted of the four chips:

- 82C431 Graphics Controller
- 82C432 Sequencer
- 82C433 Attributes Controller
- 82C434 CRT Controller

Later C&T announced a "Super EGA" dual-chip chipset: 82C435 Enhanced Graphics Controller and 82A436 Bus Interface with resolution up to 800×600 38MHz.

C&T was the first company (outside of IBM) to deliver a compatible VGA chipset, the 82C451, and VGA cards were introduced the same year as VGA (1987) based on the 82C451, opening up the IBM compatible graphics display market. This market was then entered by companies such as Trident Microsystems, Western Digital, Cirrus Logic, Oak Technology, and others, until it was saturated.

The 82C480/82C481 series is fully compatible with the IBM 8514/A graphics controller and accelerates 2D GUI operations on a 32-bit VRAM interface.

Chips and Technologies provided the Wingine video card, a very high speed framebuffer that sat in a proprietary local bus slot on supported motherboards. Epson and JCIS were two manufacturers who offered motherboards featuring the Wingine local bus slot. The Wingine was popular with users of NEXTSTEP for Intel processors, as it was one of the highest performing video cards supported by the operating system. Latest HiQVision architecture (65550, 65554, 65555, 68554, 69000 and 69030) was aimed at low-cost, high performance, highly integrated products with flatpanel/LCD direct drive features.

Apple used a number of C&T controllers in its PowerBook line. Among others, the 65550 was used in the PowerBook 3400 and the faster 65554 was used in the "Kanga" PowerBook G3, which was derived from the 3400. Early NuBus PowerBooks such as the PowerBook 1400 used the less-sophisticated 65525A.

C&T eventually ended up competing in the low end of the video market, the 65555 featured an LVDS transmitter and notably won a design in early Compaq Armada laptops.

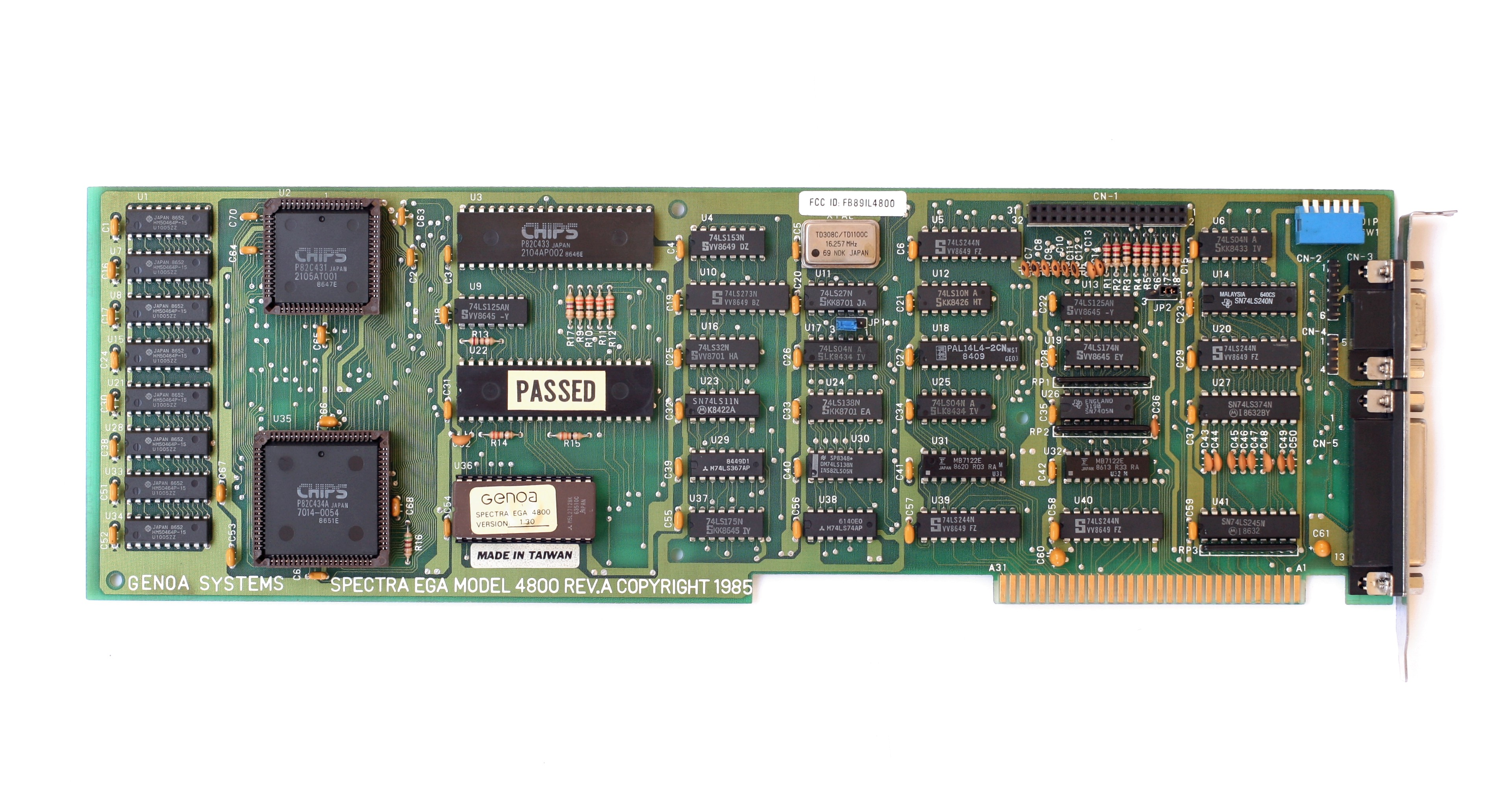
Genoa EGA using original C&T four-chip chipset

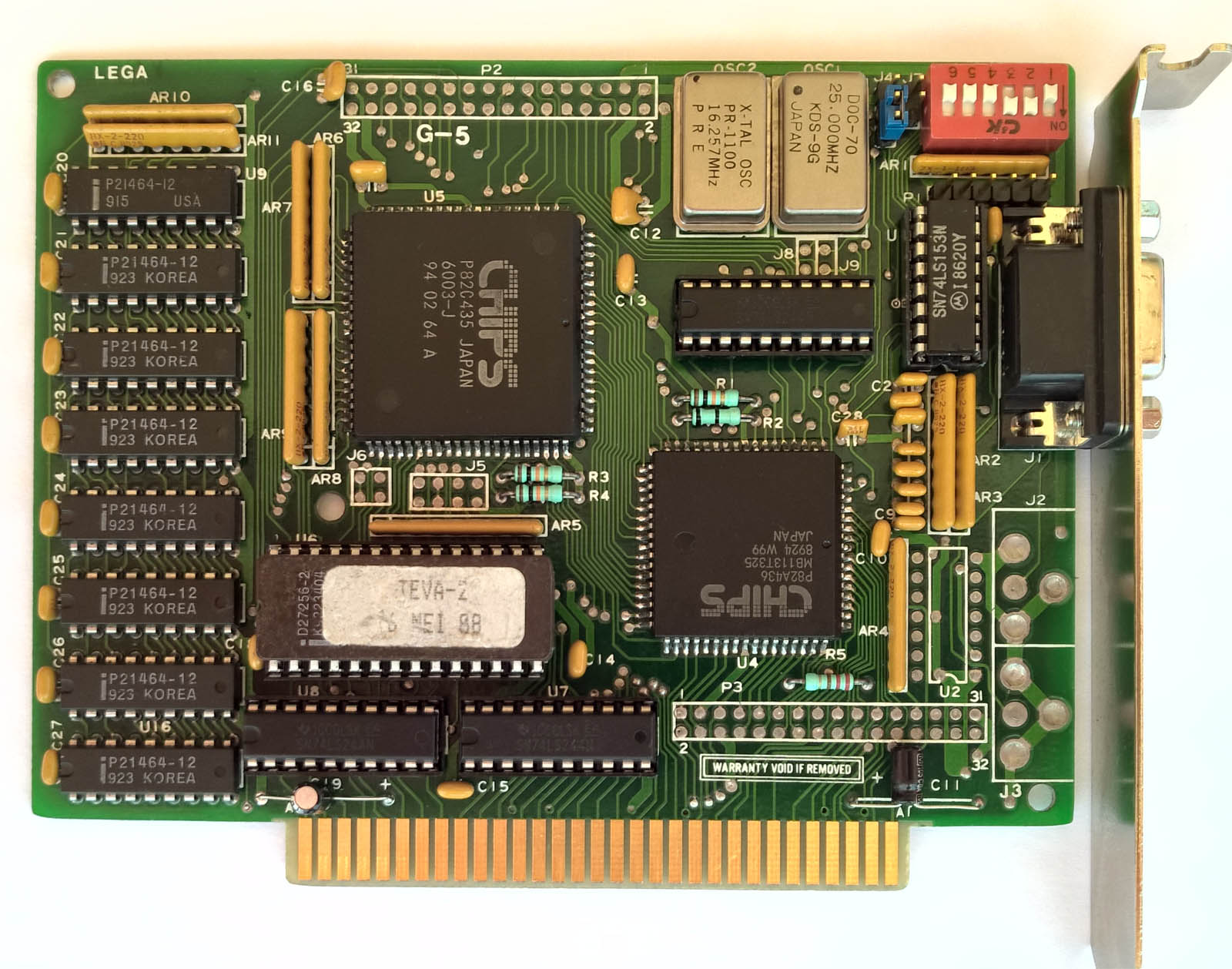
Card using C&T "Super EGA" dual-chip chipset

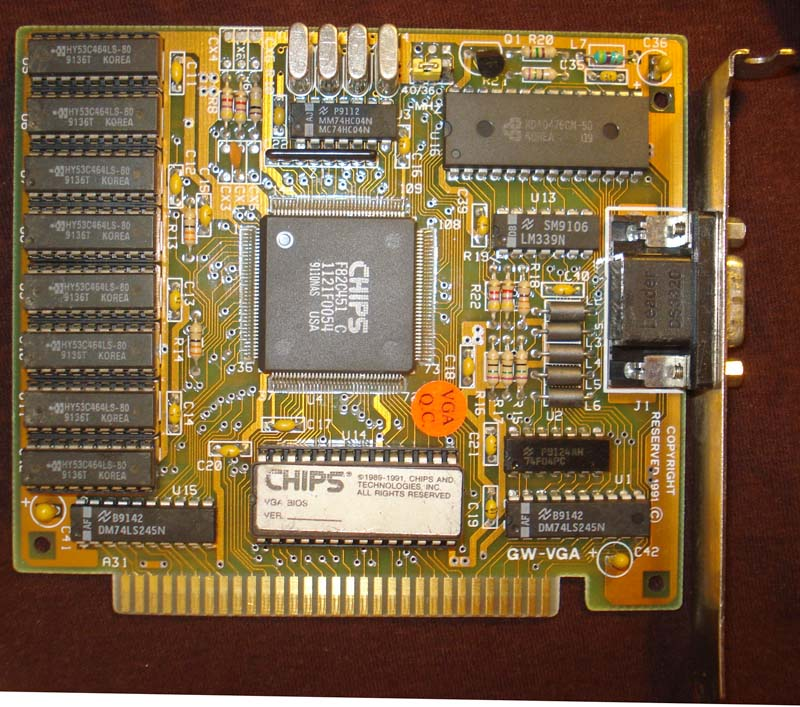
VGA-compatible ISA card with C&T chip

== See also ==
- OPTi Inc., a chipset company formed by ex-employees of Chips and Technologies
- S3 Graphics
- List of Intel chipsets
