= Intel 8289 =

Bus arbiter made by Intel

The Intel 8289 is a Bus arbiter designed for Intel 8086/8087/8088/8089. The chip is supplied in 20-pin DIP package. The 8086 (and 8088) operate in maximum mode, so they are configured primarily for multiprocessor operation or for working with coprocessors. Necessary control signals are generated by the 8289. This version was available for US$44.80 in quantities of 100.
