= Altos 586 =

Microcomputer

- Manufacturer: Altos Computer Systems
- Type: Microcomputer
- Released: 1983
- Introductory price: US$7,990–10,990 (circa US$25,800–35,500 today)
- Media: 1 MB floppy drive
- Operating system: Xenix or MP/M-86
- CPU: Intel 8086 16 bit @ 10 MHz
- Memory: 512 KB to 1 MB RAM; 12, 32, and 42 MB hard drive options
- Connectivity: 8x RS-232C serial port, expandable to 16; parallel printer port

The Altos 586 is a multi-user microcomputer that was intended for the business market. It was introduced by Altos Computer Systems in 1983.

== Description ==
Introduced in 1983, a configuration with 512 KB of RAM, an Intel 8086 processor, Microsoft Xenix, and 10 MB hard drive cost about US$8,000. Altos designed a custom memory management unit as the 8086 lacks the functionality.

3Com offered this Altos 586 product as a file server for their IBM PC networking solution in spring 1983. The network was 10BASE2 (thin-net) based, with an Ethernet AUI port on the Altos 586.

== Reception ==
"Unlike the rest of the Altos product line", InfoWorld said in November 1983, "the 586 is amazingly lightweight, full-featured, powerful and fast". The review praised the "amazing" 10MHz 8086 and other hardware, reported excellent single- and multiuser performance, and approved of the large software library and "much improved" documentation. While advising having a "UNIX guru on staff", the review concluded that the 586 was "one of the few inexpensive supermicros to cross the multiuser barrier successfully".

BYTE in August 1984 called the Altos 586 "an excellent multiuser UNIX system", with "the best performance" for the price among small Unix systems. The magazine reported that a US$10,000 (equivalent to $31,000 in 2025) Altos with 512 KB RAM and 40 MB hard drive "under moderate load approaches DEC VAX performance for most tasks that a user would normally invoke." A longer review in March 1985 stated that "despite some bugs, it's a good product." It criticized the documentation and lack of customer service for developers, but praised the multiuser performance. The author reported that his 586 had run a multiuser bulletin board system 24 hours a day for more than two years with no hardware failures. He concluded that "Very few UNIX or XENIX computers can provide all of the features of the 586 for $8990", especially for multiuser turnkey business users.

== See also ==
- Fortune XP 20
