= Supply chain diversification =

Supply chain diversification is manufacturing business terminology used to describe the act of increasing the number of suppliers used to bring products to market. It describes the abundance and flexibility of the suppliers for a certain product. As in any business decision, there are advantages and disadvantages to having more or less diversification in the supply chain. Selection of a second source is one step towards using a number of suppliers for a particular product or resource, rather than using just one source.

The main advantage or purpose of supply chain diversification, from a business or engineering perspective, is that it "mitigates the impact of adverse trade shocks".

== Objectives ==
Simply having an abundance of suppliers does not mean that a business has a diversified supply chain: each supplier must provide similar and/or equal products and be distinguishably competitive in such a way that each supplier is mutually exclusive under certain conditions. For example, supplier Alpha and supplier Beta both sell identical sprockets. Alpha sells each sprocket for $1.00 a piece and can fulfill the order in 24 hours. Beta sells each sprocket for $0.25 but they will take two weeks to fulfill. The trade-offs between time and cost is the decision one must make.

In diversifying the supply chain for a product, it is also necessary to assist and educate the suppliers on what one expects from the suppliers and what one intends to do with the supplies. It becomes important to maintain an open line of communication with all the suppliers, and this in turn will increase the overhead necessary to maintain the managers/reps for each supplier. To minimize the overhead involved, method of developing a relationship with their suppliers such as RFPs and taking bids on jobs can be utilized.

When doing business with multiple companies, as in this example, it may become necessary to standardize paperwork – such as RFQs, and purchase orders. As price fixing is illegal in countries such as the United States, traceable paper trail management becomes a legal obligation for companies seeking supply chain diversification.

In the international market, import and export regulations may become a hurdle for finding the right suppliers to diversify ones supply chain. This is especially true for US businesses since 9/11. The US customs department has enacted new regulations such as C-TPAT to encourage trade. The extra time and money spent on certifying a supplier for regulations like C-TPAT is another trade-off that management must consider when diversifying their supply chain.

== Second source examples ==
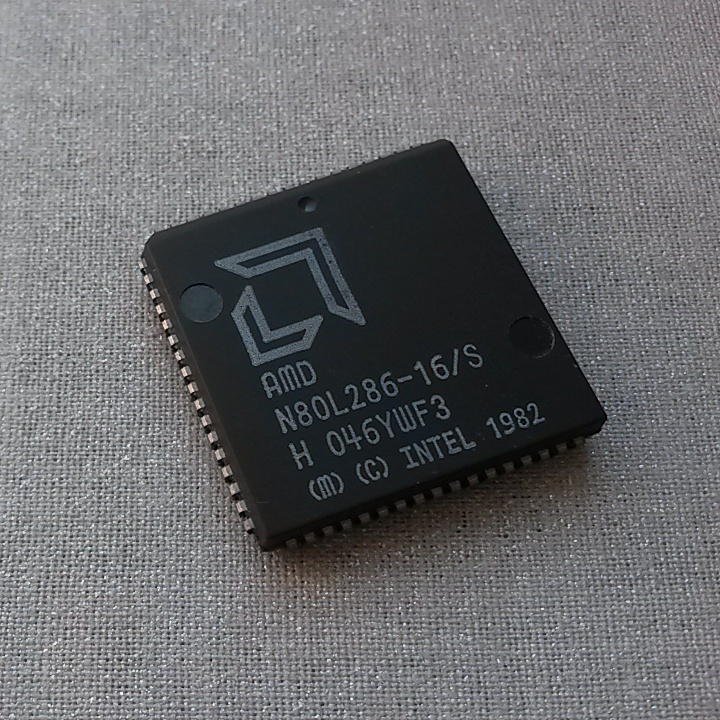
AMD 80286-16MHz

In the electronics industry, a second source is a company licensed to manufacture and sell components originally designed by another company (the "first source").

It is common for engineers and purchasers to seek components that are available from multiple sources, to avoid the risk that a problem with one supplier would prevent a product from being manufactured. For simple components such as resistors and transistors, this is not usually an issue, but for complex integrated circuits, vendors often react by licensing one or more other companies to manufacture and sell the same parts as second sources. While the details of such licenses are usually confidential, they often involve cross-licensing, so that each company also obtains the right to manufacture and sell parts designed by the other.

In the early TTL device period, wafers were small, so production was limited. More production led to lower prices, and new designs rapidly emerged.

- After the closure of its Foxconn supplier's factory in Zhengzhou, China, in 2022, Apple's "primary" supply chain management requirement was to reduce its dependence on one supplier via a diversification strategy. A proportion of Apple's iPhone production was transferred to Luxshare, another Chinese business.
- MOS Technology licensed Rockwell and Synertek to second-source the 6502 microprocessor and its support components.
- Intel licensed AMD to second-source Intel microprocessors such as the 8086 and its related support components. This second-source agreement is particularly famous for leading to much litigation between the two parties. The agreement gave AMD the rights to second-source later Intel parts, but Intel refused to provide the masks for the 386 to AMD. AMD reverse-engineered the 386, and Intel then claimed that AMD's license to the 386 microcode only allowed AMD to "use" the microcode but not to sell products incorporating it. The courts eventually decided in favor of AMD.
- When Digital Equipment Corporation (DEC) released DEC Alpha in 1992, an industry analyst said that "there must be a second source for the chip for DEC to tell a true open system story".

== Legacy suppliers ==
When businesses diversify their supply chains, the question is sometimes asked, "What do we do with our old suppliers?"

Because supply chain diversification cannot occur overnight, the legacy supplier must be involved throughout the transition phase. In most cases, the legacy supplier will remain as the primary supplier even after diversification, as there is usually a good reason why they became the original supplier.

The most common cases of the original suppliers being phased out after diversification is when supplies were being provided in-house or the material provided by that supplier has become obsolete. This is usually not the case with third-party suppliers, as the market drives them to stay competitive.

As with any new supplier, communicating with the legacy suppliers of the new direction of one's company is important for a smooth transition. At first, legacy suppliers may be apprehensive about the diversification, as it brings competition to an otherwise dominated market. That is why it is important that each supplier is distinguished from one another and they are not in direct competition with each other. Otherwise, diversification may cause duplicated efforts, extra costs, and non-cooperation that the price savings may not be able to justify.

== See also ==
- Supply chain management
