= Intel 8288 =

Bus controller chip

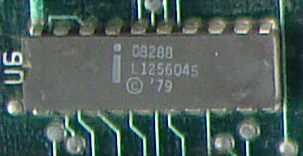
Intel 8288

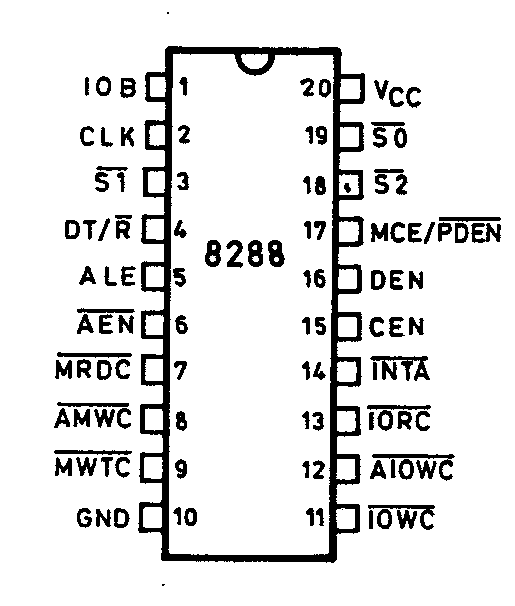
Pinout of 8288

The Intel 8288 is a bus controller designed for Intel 8086/8087/8088/8089. The chip is supplied in 20-pin DIP package. The 8086 (and 8088) operate in maximum mode, so they are configured primarily for multiprocessor operation or for working with coprocessors. Necessary control signals are generated by the 8288. It was used in the IBM PC, XT and its clones. IBM PC AT used its successor Intel 82288.

== Pin assignment and function for the control lines ==
Name	Pin	Input (I), Output (O)	Function
V_{CC}	20		Input power (+5 V)
GND	10		Ground (0 V)
S̅_{0̅}, S̅_{1̅}, S̅_{2̅}	19, 3, 18	I	Status input
CLK	2	I	Clock
A̅E̅N̅	6	I	Address Enable
CEN	15	I	Command Enable
IOB	1	I	Input/Output Bus Mode
M̅R̅D̅C̅	7	O	Memory Read Command
M̅W̅T̅C̅	9	O	Memory Write Command
A̅M̅W̅C̅	8	O	Advanced Memory Write Command
I̅O̅R̅C̅	13	O	I/O Read Command
I̅O̅W̅C̅	11	O	I/O Write Command
A̅I̅O̅W̅C̅	12	O	Advanced I/O Write Command
I̅N̅T̅A̅	14	O	Interrupt Acknowledge
DT/R̅	4	O	Data Transmit/Receive
DEN	16	O	Data Enable
MCE/P̅D̅E̅N̅	17	O	MCE (if IOB is LOW), P̅D̅E̅N̅ (if IOB is HIGH)
ALE	5	O	Address Latch Enable

== Variants ==
Both Intel 8288 and I8288 (industrial grade) version were available for US$14.30 and $33.75 in quantities of 100 respectively. The available 82C88 CMOS version was outsourced to Oki Electronic Industry Co., Ltd. The package version of Intel 82C88 branded in 20-pin PLCC of sampling at fourth quarter of 1985.
