= Intel 8284 =

Clock generator chip

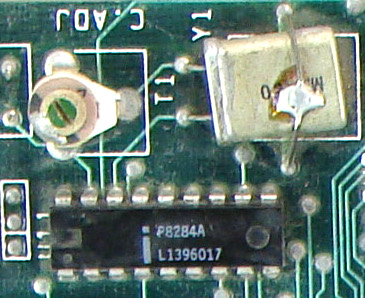
The Intel 8284A situated on a motherboard next to an oscillator crystal.

Pinout 8284

The Intel 8284 is a clock oscillator chip developed primarily for supplying clock signals for the Intel-8086/8087/8088/8089 series of processors. The commercial variant of the chip comes in 18-pin DIL and 20-pin PLCC packages, and originally was priced at $4.90 USD. The industrial version, rated for the temperatures range of -40 °C to +85 °C was priced at $13.50 USD. The available 82C84A CMOS version was outsourced to Oki Electronic Industry Co., Ltd. The available packaged Intel 82C84A version of 20-pin PLCC in sampling at first quarter of 1986.

== Function ==
The 8284 contains a clock generator capable of a third the frequency of the input clock (5 or 8MHz with the 8284A, and 10MHz with the 8284A-1), with sources selectable between an external crystal and clock input. The main clock output consists of a 4.5V (Vcc @ 5V) pulse wave at a 33.3% duty cycle, with an additional peripheral clock running at half of the main clock and a 50% duty cycle. Additional logic is provided to accommodate delays to allow for proper system start-up. It has been used in the IBM PC, IBM PC XT and IBM PCjr.
