= MAD Intelligent Systems =

MAD Intelligent Systems, Inc.
- Type: Private
- Industry: Computers
- Founded: 1982 (as Mad Computer, Inc.)
- Defunct: 1990
- Fate: Operating and IP assets divested
- Headquarters: San Jose, California
- Key people: John Nafeh, Chair & CEO Robert Blackmeer, VP Engineering Sandra B. Cook, VP Expert System
- Products: D1000 D3000 Expert Systems software
- Subsidiaries: MAD Intelligent Systems, GmbH

MAD Intelligent Systems, Inc. was founded in 1982 as Mad Computer, Inc. in Santa Clara, CA to develop, manufacture and market IBM compatible microcomputer systems based on the Intel 80186 and 80286 processors. Mad Computer, Inc. discontinued entry level compatible PC production in late 1984 and restructured as MAD Intelligent Systems, Inc. (MAD) in May 1985. The company relocated to San Jose, CA to adapt its workstations to high performance software, based on artificial intelligence ("AI")" and introduced one of the first, standalone, AI expert system workstations in the global market. The company created a European development and marketing subsidiary, MAD Intelligent Systems GmbH.

== Strategy ==
The company's initial strategy was to market the computers to original equipment manufacturers (OEM's) as additions to their respective product lines. The company promoted the modular design of its computers, permitting expansion, along with operating software largely compatible with IBM standard equipment available in the market. The product line strategy included workstations and file servers. The marketing and distribution strategy was to develop OEM alliances to generate significant orders.

The company shifted strategy in 1985 to focus on artificial intelligence, expert systems hardware and software, and customized to vertical markets, starting with financial services. MAD developed a desktop computer based on the Intel 80386 chip, capable of supporting expert systems that applied decision analysis (DA) management sciences.

The company's development strategy was to design and build major components in-house for both the OEM computer focused and AI-expert systems strategy. MAD created an operating system for a proprietary version of MS-DOS for computers, called "MAD MS DOS", and proprietary expert system elements, including LISP for integration with its own database and the "shell", or rule interpreter. The company planned to develop proprietary expert system financial services solutions, which included evaluation of export trade support and financial products trading.

== Strategic Alliances ==
The company formed a joint venture with ADS called Ariel Technology, Inc. in late 1984 to develop software and firmware products based on artificial intelligence. The alliance was terminated after multiple Ariel manages and employees resigned. The jointly developed technology was subject to litigation.

MAD entered into a three-year, OEM relationship with Philips N.V. in October 1985. The strategic alliance included Philips' acquisition of MAD's 80286 computer technology, designated P3200, through a wholly-owned subsidiary, Philips Information Systems, Ltd. of Canada. Philips also committed to partner with MAD on development of financial expert systems.

== Technology ==
The company planned to develop distinct computational workstation, and artificial intelligence technologies to create fully integrated, desktop, expert-system-based decision support systems. The hardware designs were based on the Intel 80386 processor to be augmented by a symbolic processing environment. The intelligent systems would consist of a Knowledge Server with gateways to mainframes designed to be linked to networked workstations. The Knowledge server would consist of a Knowledge-Base system and an Inference Engine. The Knowledge Base was intended to contain Heuristic Knowledge, Procedural Theory Knowledge, and Factual Data Base Knowledge.

== Key People ==
=== Management ===
Dr. John Nafeh, Chairman and CEO - John Nafeh founded MAD Computer, Inc., later MAD Intelligent Systems, Inc., in 1982. He lead development of the first MAD product, the MAD-1 IBM compatible computer.

=== Expert Systems ===
Sandra B Cook - Sandra Cook joined MAD in October 1985, she was responsible for defining and developing artificial intelligence application packages. Cook was previously head of Financial Expert Systems programs at SRI International, after a career in academia at London School of Economics and Wayne State University.

=== Markets-Financial Services ===
MAD retained two experts from SRI International to support product development and entry into the financial services market. Mr. James B Lamb was previously head of SRI's Financial Information Systems Consulting Unit and Mr. Paul A Masson was previously head of SRI's Corporate Financial Services Consulting unit.

=== Scientific Advisory Board ===
MAD retained four experts from Stanford University in the combined fields of computational science and decision analysis. Dr. John McCarthy was a professor in the Stanford Department of Computer Sciences, and was an early developer of AI concepts. Dr. Ronald A Howard was a company Director and professor at Stanford's School of Engineering, Department of Engineering-Economics, and a leading expert in decision analysis. Dr. David G Luenberger was Chairman of the Engineering-Economics Department with focus on optimization functions and software gained from experience in industry, academia and government. Dr. George Dantzig was a professor in the Standard Department of Operations Research and early developer of linear programming.

== Financial Problems and Closure ==
The company was not profitable for the years 1982 through 1985, accumulating approximately $19 million in total losses. Of this total, approximately $9 million were accumulated losses during the period the company focused on selling IBM compatible computers. Another $10.8 million reported during the 1985 period the company shifted focus to expert systems.

MAD continued financial losses through the operating years 1987 to 1989. The company had developed valuable operating and intellectual property assets, but accumulated debts to vendors that exceeded assets and projected cash flow. The company's three year strategic alliance with Philips N.V. concluded in 1989. The company had begun negotiations with creditors in 1985, resulting in sale of available assets to settle claims before beginning liquidation in 1990.

== See also ==
- IBM PC Compatible, IBM PC compatible
- Original Equipment Manufacturer, Original equipment manufacturer
- Artificial intelligence, Artificial intelligence
- Decision Analysis, Decision analysis
- Linear Programming, Linear programming
- Expert system, Expert system
- Inference Engine, Inference engine
- Knowledge-Based Systems, Knowledge-based systems
- John McCarthy (computer scientist), John McCarthy (computer scientist)
- Ronald A Howard, Ronald A. Howard
- MAD-1, MAD-1
- Philips, Philips
- Intel, Intel
