= MAD-1 =

1984 American desktop computer

- Developer: Mad Computers, Inc.
- Manufacturer: Mad Computers, Inc.
- Type: Desktop
- Released: January 1984; 42 years ago
- Discontinued: 1985
- Operating system: Mad MS-DOS; Venix; CP/M-86
- CPU: Intel 80186
- Memory: 512–704 KB RAM
- Graphics: MDA or RGBI
- Power: 160 W, 120 V AC ～

The MAD-1 (Modular Advanced Design-1) is an IBM PC–compatible desktop computer released by Mad Computers, Inc., of Santa Clara, California, in 1984. The computer was noted among the technology press for its unique, modular design and its 80186 microprocessor, the latter seldom used in PC compatibles. It received positive reviews but sold poorly and was pulled from market a year later.

== Specifications ==
The MAD-1 is an IBM PC–compatible desktop computer measuring 12 inches wide, 16 inches deep and 5.5 inches tall. The computer was noted by the technology press of the day for its unique design that stood in stark contrast with the beige IBM PC and compatibles of the day. Its exterior case was medium-gray in color and featured prominent beveled edges and louvers at the sides.

As the expanded acronym Modular Advanced Design-1 suggests, the computer is modular—split into halves across the perimeter of the case, with its disk drives occupying the Data Module on top and the rest of the computer's circuitry occupying the Computing Module on bottom. The computer came in two variants: one with two 5.25-inch double-density floppy disk drives, and the other with one such floppy drive in addition to a 10-MB half-height hard drive. The Data Module also contains the computer's 160-watt power supply unit; as such the computer is virtually unusable without it. A 12-inch amber monochrome monitor came included with the computer, as well as its 18-inch-wide 84-key keyboard, which also featured a grey finish (its keys were two-tone—dark gray for function keys and light grey for alphanumeric keys; both sets of keys featured red, black, and white lettering, depending on their function).

Each part of the MAD-1 could be opened up by unfastening two screws from their backs and pulling up the lids. Internally, the MAD-1 features the purely 16-bit Intel 80186 microprocessor, eschewing from the IBM PC's use of the Intel 8088 with its performance-limiting 8-bit external data bus, and 512 KB of RAM stock (expandable to 704 KB). Unlike the IBM PC, the stock MAD-1 features only one ISA expansion slot, and the only way to expand the memory to the maximum is through occupying this sole slot with a proprietary expansion card that was sold by Mad Computers. The company however offered an optional Expansion Module adding four more ISA slots, connecting to the back of MAD-1's Computing Module as a "trailer".

The MAD-1 came shipped with a semi-custom version of MS-DOS, called Mad MS-DOS. Mad MS-DOS is largely compatible with software running on the former; the included distribution however lacked GW-BASIC and several vital components of PC DOS (IBM implementation of MS-DOS), such as GRAPHICS.COM and FDISK.COM. Mad Computers also sold the MAD-1 with Venix (a Unix variant) and CP/M-86 as optional operating systems.

== Development ==
The MAD-1 was developed by Mad Computers, Inc., a company founded by John Nafeh in 1982 in Santa Clara, California. Before founding Mad, Nafeh had incorporated Multi-Media Video, Inc. (MMV), in 1977 to distribute Apple Computer's Apple II microcomputer in the Middle East. MMV generated $430,000 in Apple II sales to the Middle East in 1979 and $4.9 million in sales in 1982. The MAD-1's initial price tag of US$4,275 was higher than that of the original IBM PC at that point in time. Mad sales representative Paul Schaut explained: "Once you get into the price game, you wind up getting into discounting, mass merchandising, and constantly chasing IBM's price cuts in order to stay under $600 to $700 cheaper. ... We plan to stay competitive with IBM, but we aren't selling the system on price alone. Compatibility with the IBM PC is only one of our features."

The MAD-1 was one of the of approximately twenty (20) IBM PC compatibles based on the 80186 processor. A shortage in 80186 processors in mid-1983 delayed its original release date from spring 1983 to late 1983. Mad was able to secure 20,000 processors for an equivalent amount of manufactured units by late 1983, and they released the MAD-1 in January 1984.

== Sales and reception ==
Mad Computers manufactured 20,000 units for its initial production run of the MAD-1 by January 1984. The company sold the computer in the United States through a dealer network of 200 retail outlets and corporate reseller. In the United Kingdom, the computer sold through MBS Microtex. The MAD-1 received largely positive reviews in the computer press. It sold poorly, however, with Mad Computer having to appeal to the computing press for an expansion of its dealer network in the summer of 1984. That same summer, Mad Computers sued Apple Computer, accusing the latter of monopolistic behavior by dropping Nafeh's MMV as a dealer once they caught word of the MAD-1's development. Mad Computers discontinued the MAD-1 in 1985 and dropped out of the computer market entirely for nearly half the year. They reemerged as Mad Intelligent Systems, Inc. in May 1985, and began selling more generic IBM PC clones through their business partner Philips.

== In popular culture ==
The computer can be seen in the movie Runaway (1984).

== Citations ==
- Avant, Harry (February 1985). "Mad-1 Computer: Latest Warrior in the PC Arena". Interface Age. 10 (2). McPheters, Wolfe and Jones: 45 – via Gale. ProQuest 236274031 (subscription required)
- Carlson, Susan (June 13, 1983). "Mad's Micro, Priced over PC, Faces Delay". ISO World. 6 (11). CW Communications: 13 – via Gale. Gale A516257. (subscription required)
- Chin, Kathy (January 16, 1984). "Chip shortage slows micro manufacturing". InfoWorld. 6 (2–3). CW Communications: 99–100 – via Google Books.
- Foster, Edward S. (September 1984). "Ease of Use Is Key to New Business Products: Power and Function Are Keys to New Computer". Personal Computing. 8 (9). Ziff-Davis: 17 – via Gale. (subscription required)
- Freeze, Ken (September 24, 1984). "MAD-1 Computer". InfoWorld. 6 (39). IDG Publications: 113–115 – via Google Books.
- Jenkins, A. (October 2, 1984). "Compatibles: The Move to Diversify". PC Week. 1 (39). Ziff-Davis: 31–45 – via Gale. (subscription required)
- Poor, Alfred (July 24, 1984). "A Sporty Compatible". PC Magazine. 3 (14). Ziff-Davis: 128–131 – via Google Books.
- Raess, John (July 25, 1984). "Small computer firm claims Apple targeted it for 'destruction'". The Peninsula Times Tribune: B10 – via Newspapers.com.
- Robinson, P. (September 1984). "The MAD-1: Stylish Design and Fast Processing Distinguish This IBM Compatible". Popular Computing. 3 (11). McGraw-Hill: 127–128 – via Gale. (subscription required)
- Staff writer (January 23, 1984a). "Mad Set to Ship IBM-Like System". Computer Retail News (39). UBM LLC: 95 – via Gale. (subscription required)
- Staff writer (July 16, 1984b). "Start-Up Mad Computer Kicks Off Dealer-Recruitment Program". Computer Retail News (62). UBM LLC: 68 – via Gale. (subscription required)
- Staff writer (September 1984c). "Mad for the UK". Business Systems & Equipment. Maclean Hunter: 15 – via Gale. (subscription required)
- Staff writer (1989). "MAD Intelligent Systems, Inc.". AI Trends: Annual Report 1989. DM Data Inc. p. 248 – via Google Books.
- Webster, Robin; Glenn A. Hart (April 3, 1984). "Lifting the Veil of Compatibility". PC Magazine. 3 (6). Ziff-Davis: 131–144 – via Google Books.
