= Pronto Computers =

American computer company (1983–1987)

Pronto Computers, Inc.
- Type: Public
- Industry: Computer
- Founded: 1983; 43 years ago in Torrance, California
- Founders: Henry Gasbarro; Skip Hansen; Doris V. Kaplan; Judy Anthony
- Defunct: 1987; 39 years ago
- Fate: Bankruptcy
- Products: Pronto System 16; Pronto Transportable Solution

Pronto Computers, Inc., was an American computer company based in Torrance, California, active from 1983 to 1987. During its brief existence, the company released a duo of IBM PC compatible computer systems and a family of high-spec graphics cards. Pronto's first product, the System 16, was widely lauded for its graphical prowess and industrial design; in 1983, I.D. magazine named it the best-designed product in the field of instrumentation and equipment. The System 16 was followed up with the Pronto Transportable Solution, a portable computer. Both it and the Pronto 16 ran the Intel 80186, a microprocessor seldom used in IBM PC compatibles. Pronto Computers went bankrupt in 1987, shortly after Black Monday.

== History ==
Pronto Computers was incorporated in Torrance, California, in March 1983. Its founding members were Henry Gasbarro, CEO; Skip Hansen, vice president of engineering and sales; Doris V. Kaplan, comptroller; and Judy Anthony, head of product marketing. According to Computerworld, the company was established to design, manufacture, and market computer systems and peripherals for businesses. Although the firm manufactured systems that could run many applications designed for IBM's Personal Computer lineup, Gasbarro described compatibility as only a secondary design goal. He explained in 1984: "We created a professional product to solve various business needs. We didn't aim at being PC-compatible, but we do get some of the fallout".

=== Pronto System 16 ===
A month after Pronto's incorporation, at COMDEX/Spring, the company unveiled the Pronto System 16, an IBM PC compatible running an 8-MHz Intel 80186 microprocessor. The System 16 was among the few compatibles based on the 80186; designing such machines based on 186 was a notoriously difficult proposition, owing to the processor's large-scale integration of support chips largely deviating in functionality from the support chips present on the original IBM PC's motherboard.

Besides the unique processor, the computer was also one of the first personal computers built into a tower form factor. According to the Smithsonian, the System 16 pioneered several design concepts in personal computers that became prevalent in the following decades, including a swivel–tilt monitor base, a compact footprint, adjustable keyboard tilt, and ample cable length for the monitor, allowing the bulkier tower to be stored a considerable distance from the monitor. (A common practice was to put the tower on the floor.) The System 16's unique industrial design earned the company an award in I.D. magazine in 1983 for best-designed product in the field of instrumentation and equipment. Its design was rendered by Joseph D. Ricchio Jr. of Ron Loosen Associates in Los Alamitos, California.

The System 16 comes equipped with 128 KB of RAM stock, expandable to a maximum of 1 MB. Depending on the computer's configuration of drives, the System 16 sold for between US$2,995 and US$5,995. The system could be ordered with one or two double-density, 800-KB 5.25-inch floppy disk drives; one such floppy drive and a hard drive; or two hard drives. The hard drives in question were not the conventional "Winchester"-style, enclosed-platter drives used by many other personal computers—including the IBM PC XT—but were removable disk cartridges manufactured by SyQuest. This variant of hard drive was chosen for its compactness and ease of upgrading to drives accepting higher-capacity cartridges, which the company promised at a later date. Indeed, in May 1984, the company began selling System 16s with SyQuest drives between 23 MB and 56.7 MB in capacity, in solo- and dual-hard-drive configurations.

The System 16 can also produce high-resolution graphics using two special modes developed for the NEC μPD7220 display controller on the computer's graphics card. Both modes implemented bitplanes: in color mode, eight colors from a palette of sixteen can be displayed simultaneously; in monochrome mode, eight shades of gray can be displayed simultaneously. As Pronto did not ship a color monitor for the Pronto until 1984, early adopters who wanted to harness the computer's high-resolution mode had to subsist with the eight shades of green generated by its green-phosphor monochrome CRT.

Between 1983 and 1987, Pronto sold 1,000 units of the System 16, according to the Smithsonian.

=== Pronto Transportable Solution ===
In November 1983, the company introduced an IBM PC–compatible portable computer also based on the 186 microprocessor. Called the Pronto Transportable Solution, the computer was built into a 19.75 by 17.25 by 8 inches (50.2 by 43.8 by 20.3 cm) suitcase-style chassis and a nine-inch monochrome CRT display, available in amber and green phosphors. The computer featured 256 KB of RAM stock and featured an EPROM socket for custom software on chips, between 16 KB and 64 KB in total length. The computer was optioned with the same SyQuest disk cartridge system as the System 16, available in 5.6-MB and 23.3-MB drive variants, or the user could have bought a unit with dual 5.25-inch floppy drives.

=== Graphics cards and decline ===
In September 1986, the company introduced a line of high-spec ISA graphics cards aimed at the computer-aided design market. Called the HR1200 Series, all cards were 16 bits in width. While they could support the 8-bit ISA slots of the original IBM PC and the PC XT (and compatibles), only the PC/AT and RT PC could take advantage of the data lines of the 16-bit portion of the cards. The HR1200 family comprised four cards: the first with a 1280-by-1024 pixel resolution and 256 simultaneous colors (from a palette of 4,096 colors); the second with a 1280-by-1024 resolution and 16 simultaneous colors; the third with a 1024-by-768 resolution and 256 simultaneous colors; and the last with a 1024-by-768 resolution and 16 simultaneous colors.

Pronto Computers filed for bankruptcy in 1987, shortly after its initial public offering amid the Black Monday financial crisis.
