= Intel 8283 =

8-bit latch made by Intel

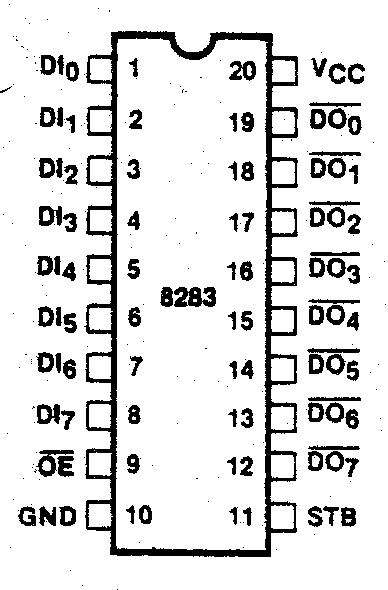
Pinout 8283

The Intel 8283 is an 8-bit latch, which was developed primarily for the Intel-8086/8087/8088/8089-processors. The component comes in 20-pin DIL package. It was licensed i.e. to NEC and Siemens. If O̅E̅ (Output Enable) connected to GND, the chip is selected. STB (Strobe) is connected to the pin ALE (Address Latch Enable) of the processor and takes over the address data from the multiplexed address-/databus. The incoming data is inverted – as opposed to the 8282. The Intel 8283 and I8283 (industrial grade) version was available for US$5.55 and $16.25 in quantities of 100 respectively.

== Literature and datasheets ==
- Datasheet (Intel): 8282/8283 Octal Latch
- NEC Electronics (Europe) GmbH, 1982 Catalog, p. 703–706 (μPB8282/83 8-Bit Latches)
