= Siemens PC-D =

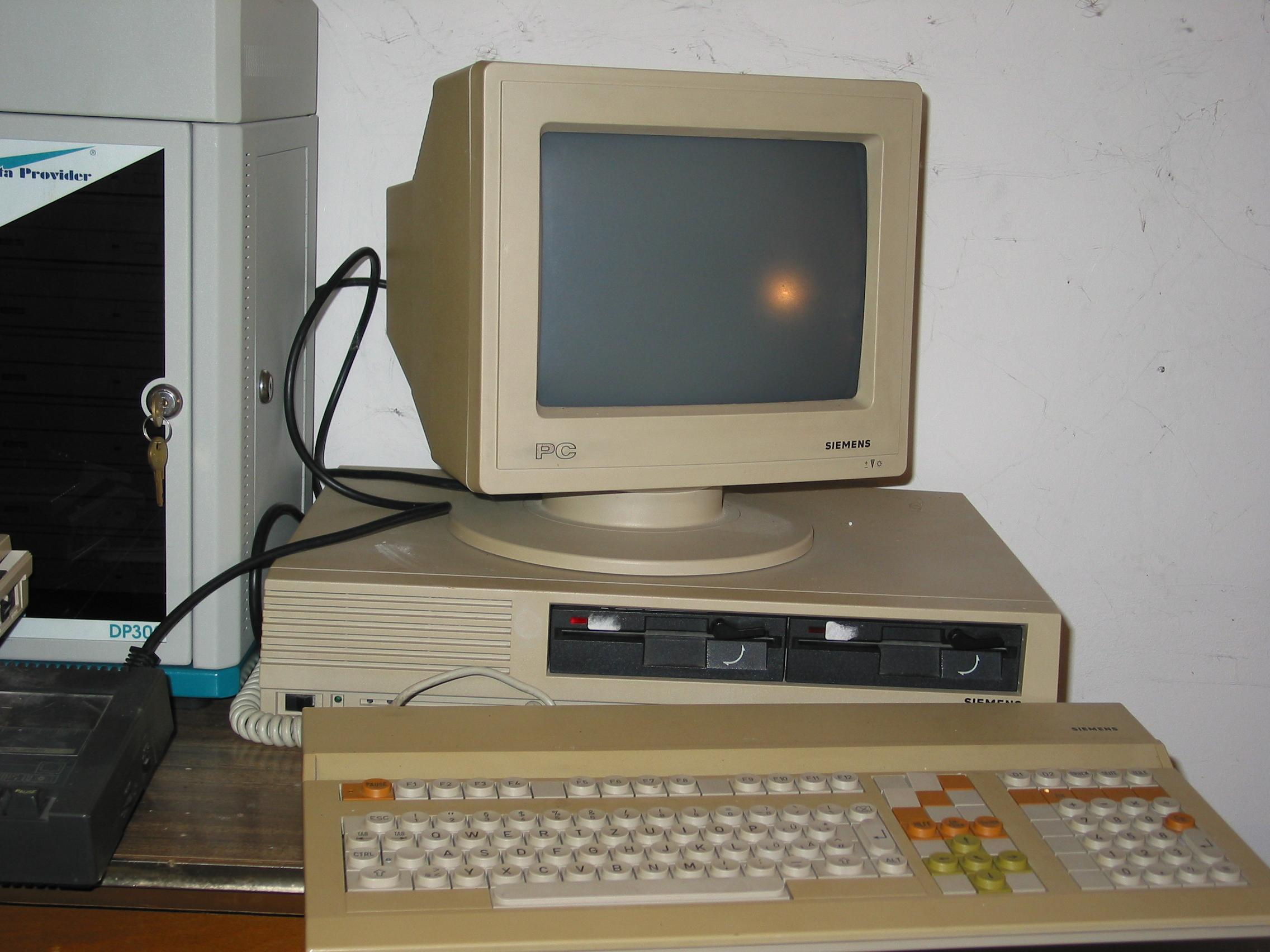
- Type: Personal computer
- Released: PC-X: 1982; 44 years ago PC-D: 1984; 42 years ago
- Discontinued: 1986
- Media: 5¼″ floppy disk, hard disk
- Operating system: PC-X: SINIX, PC-D: MS-DOS 2.11
- CPU: Intel 80186 @ 8 MHz
- Memory: 128 KiB – 1 MiB
- Successor: PCD-2

The PC-D and PC-X were personal computers sold by Siemens between 1982 (PC-X)/1984 (PC-D) and 1986. The PC-D was the first MS-DOS-based PC sold by Siemens, though not hardware compatible with the IBM PC. It was slowly phased out after the introduction of the PCD-2. Which featured an IBM PC compatible design.

== Hardware ==
Most of the hardware was identical. While the PC-X was equipped with 1 MB of RAM, a hard disk and a MMU, the PC-D came with 128 kB of RAM and a single 5¼″ floppy disk drive in its basic configuration. More powerful configurations with 256 kB, 512 kB or 1 MB and either a second floppy disk drive or a hard disk with a capacity of 13 or 20 MB were also available. The keyboard layout differed between the two models.

The PC-D had a certain level of compatibility with the IBM PC architecture but differed in a number of aspects:

- Intel 80186 processor
- Double-density floppy disk drives with a proprietary 80-track format (729,088 bytes)
- Proprietary monochrome graphics adapter with a resolution of 640×350 pixels and black-on-white text mode (which could be inverted through a software tool)
- 12″ monochrome monitor, powered through the graphics card
- V.11 serial ports for keyboard and mouse (the latter being optional)
- Different keyboard layout: among others, the PC-D had a Help key and keys to control a connected printer but only five cursor keys (←↓↑→ and Home)
- Both V.11 and V.24 ports for printers
- A parallel port was available only as an add-on; if not installed, LPT1: and LPT2: would address the serial ports
- Proprietary VG96 Local Bus
- The power switch could be inhibited in software
- A debug button (located next to the reset button) issued an NMI, by default dropping into a monitor ROM to display the contents of the processor registers
- The mainboard had a SCSI interface, although hard disks had a ST506 interface and were connected to a separate controller board.

Optional hardware included:

- a two-button mouse
- the PT20 daisy wheel printer, the PT88 (Siemens' ink jet printer) or the PT89 (the A3 variant of the PT88)
- the UTC 101, UTC 421-1 or UTC 424-4 teletex controllers, the latter of which could also be used to network up to four PC-Ds
- a tape drive with a capacity of 45 MB

== Software ==
The PC-D shipped with MS-DOS 2.11 (version 3.20 became available later), which was extended with a menu system through which users could launch applications without having to use the command line. Application software included:

- Microsoft Word
- Microsoft Multiplan
- Microsoft Chart
- dBase,
- GW-BASIC interpreter and compiler
- Lotus Spotlight, an application suite which consisted of a notepad, calculator, calendar, card file, phone book and file manager which could be launched on top of other running DOS applications
- Open Access, an office suite which included a database, a spreadsheet application, a charting tool, a calendar and a BBS terminal
- A 9750 terminal emulation for BS-2000 mainframe access
- Some simple games
- Microsoft Windows 1.0

Hardware addresses on the PC-D differed from those on IBM compatible PCs, causing applications with direct hardware access to crash, unless adapted (recompiled or patched). Clean DOS application would rund flawless, this includes all Windows and GEM programs.

The PC-X shipped with SINIX.
