= Intel 80186 =

16-bit microcontroller

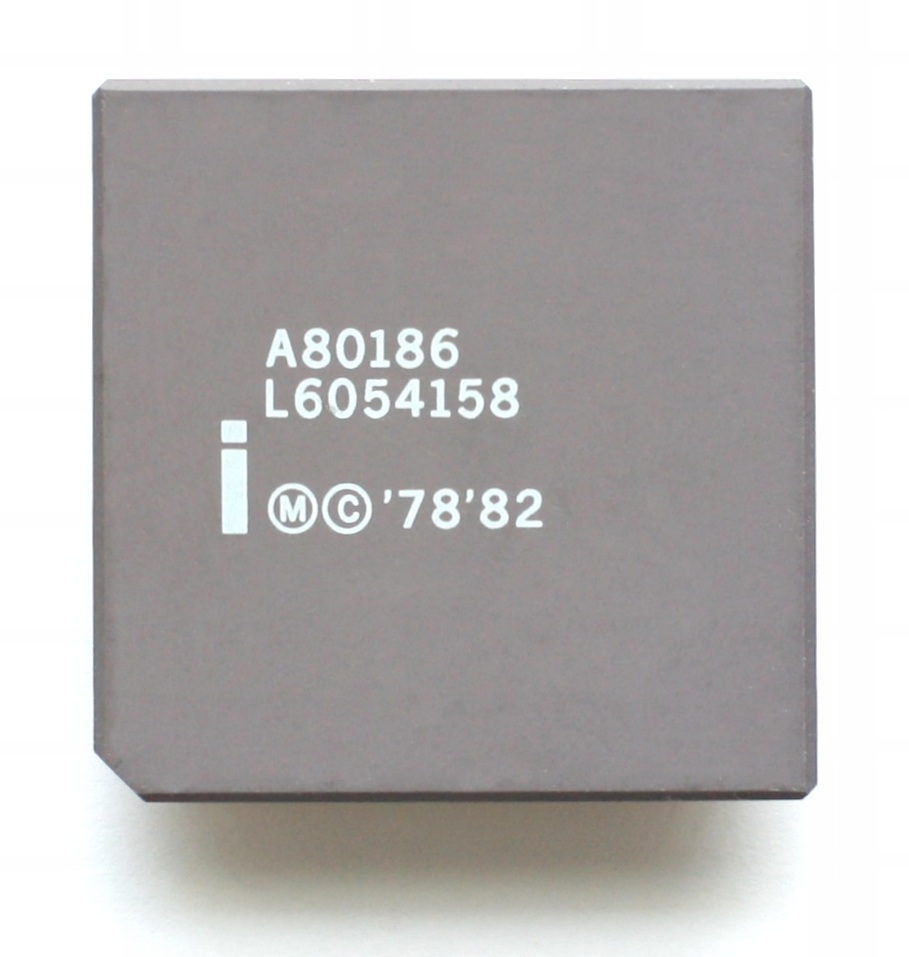
- An Intel A80186 processor in a gray ceramic package

General information
- Launched: January 1982; 44 years ago
- Discontinued: September 28, 2007; 19 years ago
- Common manufacturer: Intel, AMD, Fujitsu, Siemens, Harris, Intersil

Performance
- Max. CPU clock rate: 6 MHz to 25 MHz
- FSB speeds: 6 MHz to 25 MHz
- Data width: 16 bits
- Address width: 20 bits

Physical specifications
- Transistors: 55,000
- Co-processor: 8087 and later, 80C187 (for 80C186 only)
- Package: 68-pin PLCC; 68-pin LCC; 68-pin PGA
- Socket: PGA68; PLCC-68 (variant); LCC-68 (variant)

Architecture and classification
- Application: Desktop, Embedded
- Technology node: 3 μm to 1 μm
- Instruction set: x86-16

History
- Predecessors: 8086, 8088
- Successor: i386

Support status
- Unsupported

The Intel 80186 (also called the iAPX 186 or just 186) is a 16-bit microprocessor and microcontroller introduced by Intel in January 1982 as an enhanced derivative of the Intel 8086. It adds instructions and integrates system peripherals while maintaining compatibility with software written for the 8086.

The Intel 80188 is a lower-cost variant with an 8-bit external data bus, similar to the Intel 8088.

== Description ==
A greatly simplified block diagram of the 80186 architecture

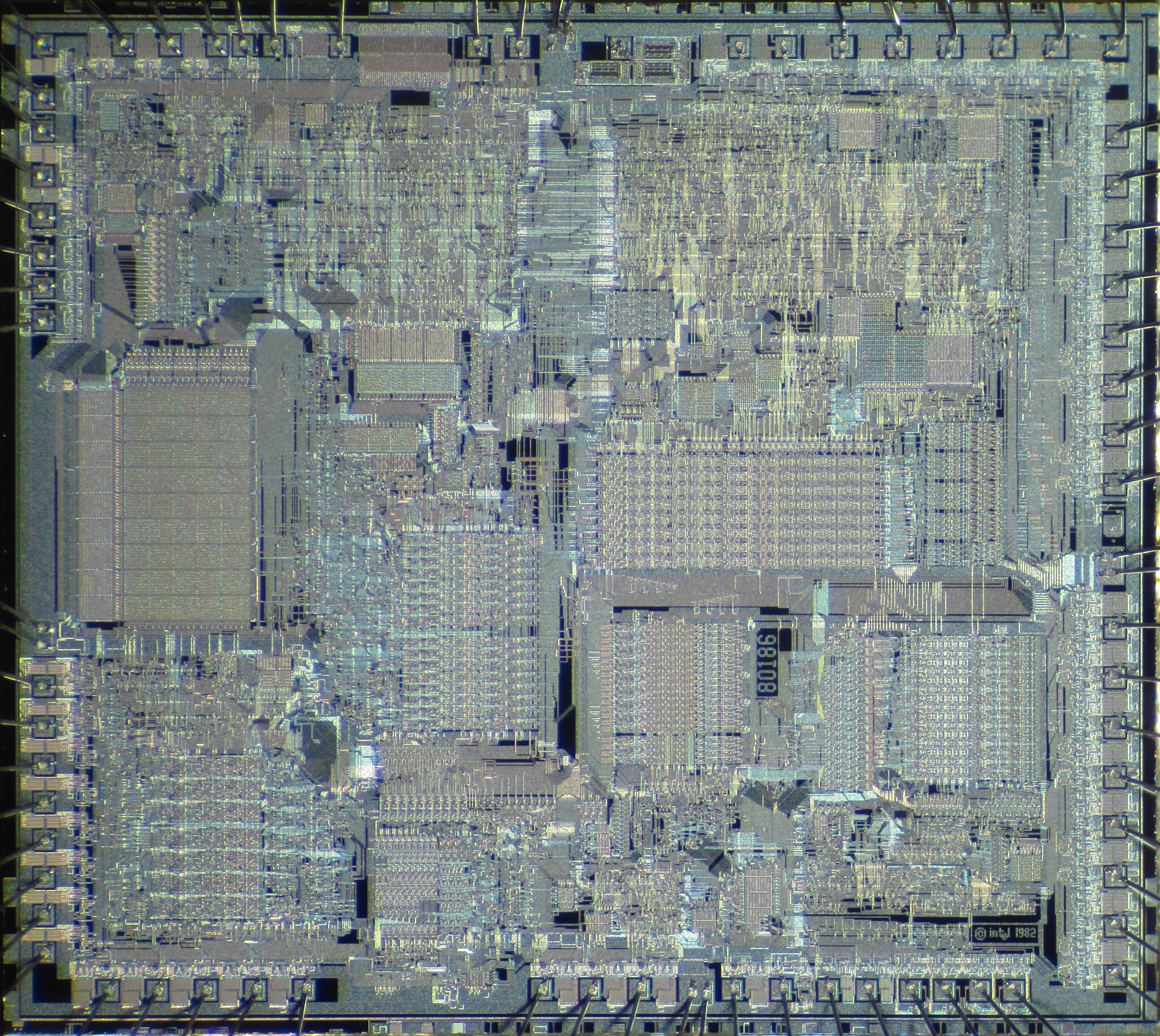
Die of Intel 80186

The 80186 series was designed to reduce the number of integrated circuits required. It included features such as clock generator, interrupt controller, timers, wait state generator, DMA channels, and external chip select lines. It was used in numerous embedded systems, as microcontrollers with external memory.

The initial clock rate of the 80186 was 6 MHz, but due to more hardware available for the microcode to use, especially for address calculation, many individual instructions completed in fewer clock cycles than on an 8086 at the same clock frequency. For instance, the common register+immediate addressing mode was significantly faster than on the 8086, (Note: In fact, all variants, including reg+reg and reg+reg+immediate were faster.) especially when a memory location was both (one of) the operand(s) and the destination. Multiply and divide also showed great improvement, being several times as fast as on the original 8086, and multi-bit shifts were done almost four times as quickly as in the 8086.

A few new instructions were introduced with the 80186 (referred to as the 8086-2 instruction set in some datasheets): enter/leave (replacing several instructions when handling stack frames), pusha/popa (push/pop all general registers), bound (check array index against bounds), and ins/outs (input/output of string). A useful immediate mode was added for the push, imul, and multi-bit shift instructions. These instructions were also included in the contemporary 80286 and in successor chips. (Note: The instruction set of the 80286 is a superset of the 80186's, plus new instructions for protected mode.)

== Variants ==
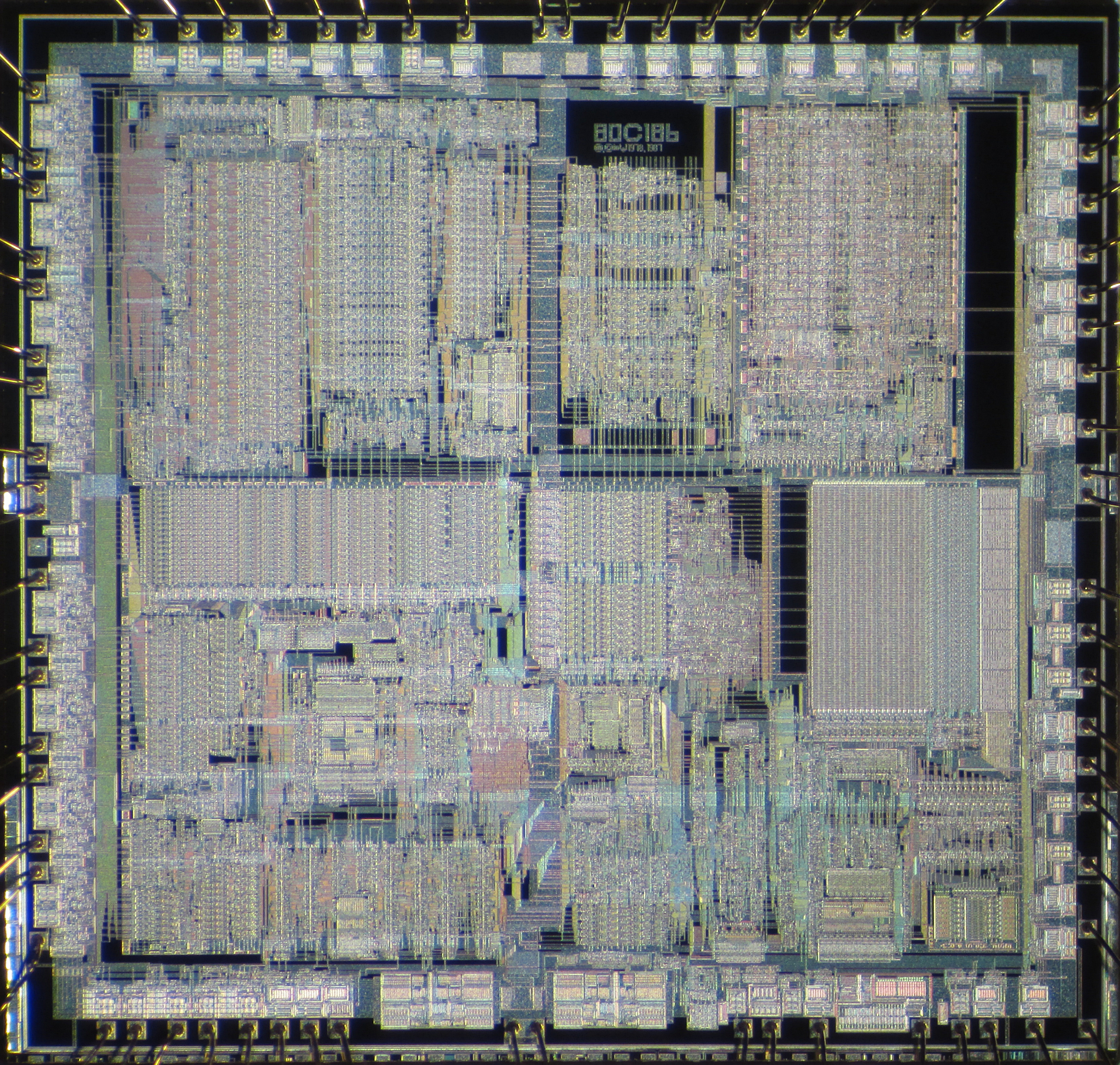
Die of Intel 80C186

The (redesigned) CMOS version, 80C186, introduced DRAM refresh, a power-save mode, and a direct interface to the 80C187 floating-point numeric coprocessor. Intel second-sourced this microprocessor to Fujitsu Limited around 1985. Both packages for Intel 80186 version were available in 68-pin PLCC and PGA in sampling at third quarter of 1985. The 12.5 MHz Intel 80186-12 version, built using the 1.5 μm HMOS-III process, was available for US$36 in quantities of 100. The 12.5 MHz Intel 80C186 version using the CHMOS III-E technology used approximately 90 mA under normal load and only 32 mA under power-save mode. It was available in 68-pin PLCC, CPGA, or CLCC package.

The M80C186 military version was available in 10 and 12 MHz versions. They met MIL-STD-883 Rev. C and MIL-STD-1553 bus application standards. The 12 MHz CHMOS version consumes approximately 100 mA. The available packages were 68-pin CPGA and CQFP. The 10 MHz M80C186 PGA version was available for US$378 in 100-unit quantities.

The 80C186EB was a fully static design for the application-specific standard product using the 1 μm CHMOS IV technology. They were available in 3- and 5-volt versions with 84-lead PLCC and 80-lead EIAJ QFP packaging. It was also available for US$16.95 in 1,000-unit quantities.

The Intel 80C186EC contains 4 DMA channels, 2 interrupt controllers, 22 I/O which control two serial channels, and 4 timers. This version was available for US$17.70 in quantities of 1,000 units. This microcontroller was only available in a 5-volt version. Both Intel 80C186EC and 80C186EA contain three different power-management modes, which has idle, powerdown and powersave. The 80C186EA has both 5- and 3-volt versions.

The 80C186XL version was available up to 20 MHz, which is compatible with existing CMOS version of 80C186 that has 25% higher performance and 50% lower power consumption. This version used 1 μm CHMOS process technology. Both 80C186EA and 80C186XL were available for US$11.80 in quantities of 1,000 units.

== 80188 series ==
Intel 80188
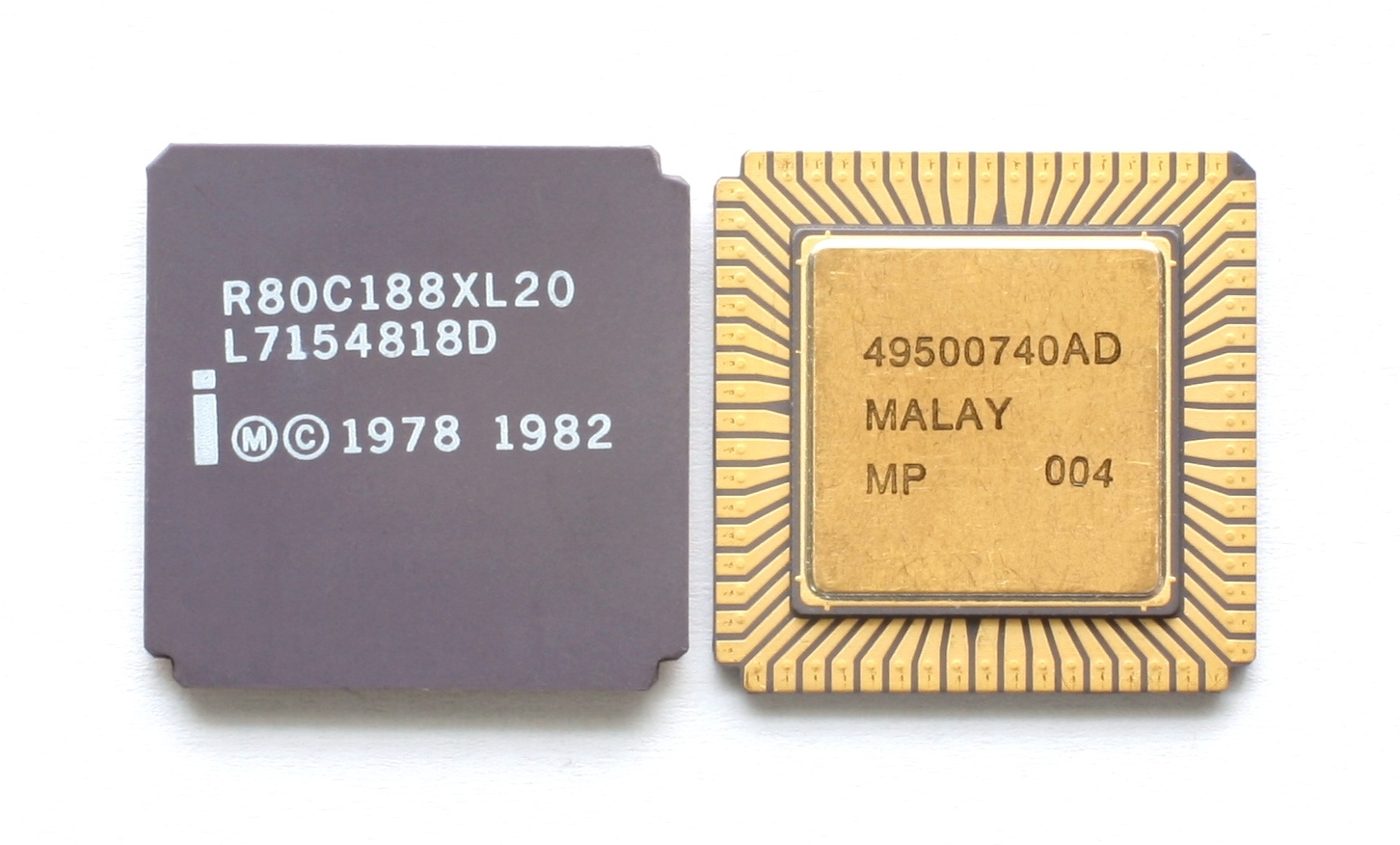
- An Intel R80C188XL20, an LCC variant of the 80188 processor. It has a ceramic package and gold plated contacts on the bottom.

General information
- Launched: 1982
- Discontinued: September 2007
- Common manufacturer: Intel, AMD, Fujitsu, Siemens

Performance
- Max. CPU clock rate: 6 MHz to 40 MHz
- Data width: 8 bits
- Address width: 20 bits

Physical specifications
- Transistors: 55,000
- Cores: 1
- Co-processor: Intel 80187
- Package: 68-pin PLCC; 68-pin LCC; 100-pin PQFP (engineering sample only); 68-pin PGA
- Socket: PGA68; PLCC-68 (variant); LCC-68 (variant)

Architecture and classification
- Technology node: 3 μm to 1 μm
- Instruction set: x86-16

Products, models, variants
- Variant: The Intel 80188 is a variant of the Intel 80186.

History
- Predecessor: Intel 8088
- Successors: Intel 80386 (The 80286 was also introduced in early 1982, and thus contemporary with the 80186)

The 80188 variant, with an 8-bit external data bus was also available; this made it less expensive to connect to peripherals. The 16-bit registers and the one megabyte address range were unchanged, however. It had a throughput of 1 million instructions per second. Intel second sourced this microprocessor to Fujitsu Limited around 1985. The 80188 was available in 68-pin PLCC and PGA packages and first delivered in sample quantities in the third quarter of 1985. The available 80C188EB in fully static design for the application-specific standard product using the 1-micron CHMOS IV technology. They were available in 3- and 5-volt versions with 84-lead PLCC and 80-lead EIAJ QFP versions. It was also available for US$15.15 in 1,000 unit quantities.

The 80188 series was generally intended for embedded systems, as microcontrollers with external memory. Therefore, to reduce the number of chips required, it included features such as clock generator, interrupt controller, timers, wait state generator, DMA channels, and external chip select lines. While the N80188 was compatible with the 8087 numeric co-processor, the 80C188 was not. It did not have the ESC control codes integrated.

== Uses ==
=== In personal computers ===
Because the integrated hardware included in the 80186 was incompatible with the support chips chosen by IBM for the 8088-based IBM PC released a few months earlier, the chip did not see wide success in the PC market. IBM chose the 80286 for its successor, the IBM PC/AT, released in August 1984. Most other PC-compatible manufacturers followed.

Regardless, several notable personal computers used the 80186:

- Danish Regnecentralen: RC750 Partner running CCP/M
- Danish Regnecentralen: RC759 Piccoline running CCP/M
- Australian Dulmont Magnum laptop, one of the first laptops
- Wang Office Assistant, marketed as a PC-like stand-alone word processor
- MAD-1, a semi–IBM PC-compatible desktop computer with a modular design
- Pronto System 16, another PC compatible
- Mindset, a very early graphics workstation
- Siemens PC-D (not 100% IBM PC compatible but using MS-DOS 2.11)
- Compis, a Swedish school computer
- French SMT-Goupil G4
- RM Nimbus PC-186, the first version of a series of British school computers
- Unisys ICON, a Canadian school computer
- ORB Computer by ABS
- HP 100LX, HP 200LX, HP 1000CX, and HP OmniGo 700LX
- Tandy 2000 desktop, a somewhat PC-compatible workstation with sharp graphics for its day
- Telex 1260, a desktop PC-XT compatible
- Philips :YES
- Nokia MikroMikko 2
- IBM PCradio
- Altos 486 Xenix 3.1-based multiuser server
- Convergent Technologies B25 NGEN used a 186. Later models used subsequent X86 processors

In addition to the above examples of stand-alone implementations of the 80186 for personal computers, there were at least two examples of "add-in" accelerator card implementations: the BBC Master 512, Acorn's plug-in for the BBC Master range of computers containing an 80186–10 with 512 KB of RAM, and the Orchid Technology PC Turbo 186, released in 1985. It was intended for use with the original Intel 8088-based IBM PC (Model 5150).

=== Other devices ===
The Intel 80186 and 80188 are often embedded in electronic devices that are not primarily computers. For example:

- The 80186 was used to control the Microtek 8086 in-circuit emulator.
- The 80188 was embedded inside the Intel 14.4EX modem released in 1991. The 16 MHz processor was used to perform complex algorithms needed for forward error correction, trellis modulation, and echo cancellation in the modem.
- The second-generation SatisFAXtion board, which is a FAX/modem ISA card, uses this processor.
- The IBM 7171 protocol converter, which made ASCII character-oriented terminals appear as an IBM 3270 terminal to an IBM mainframe, used the Intel 80186 as its CPU.
- The 80188 was used in the Tektronix 2246 analog oscilloscope to process signal measurements.
- It was also used on the controller card for Digital Equipment Corporation's DECtalk speech synthesizer system.

== End of life ==
On March 30, 2006, Intel announced that production of the 80186 and 80188, along with the production of other processor models such as the 80386 and 80486, would cease at the end of September 2007. In later production, these processors were not used in classic computers, but inside industrial electronics and control systems. Pin- and instruction-compatible replacements might still be manufactured by various third-party sources, and FPGA versions are publicly available.

== See also ==
- iAPX, for the iAPX name
- NEC V20/V30, for a third-party CPU also supporting the 80186 instructions
