= Intel 8282 =

8-bit latch made by Intel

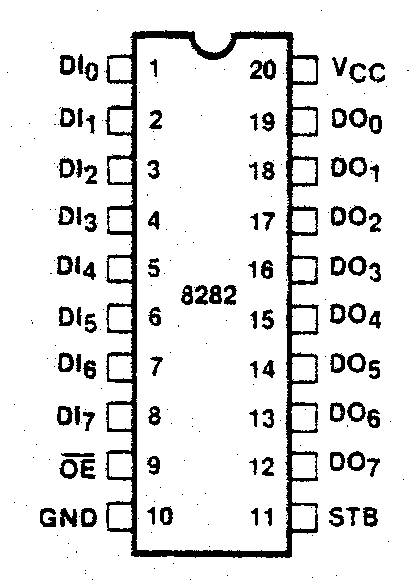
Pinout 8282

The Intel 8282 is an 8-bit latch, which was developed primarily for the Intel-8086/8087/8088/8089-processors. The component comes in 20-pin DIL package. It was licensed to companies such as NEC and Siemens. With the ROM-less versions of the MCS-48 and MCS-51 microcontroller (8035/8039 and 8031/8032) compact systems with external ROM / EPROM can be realized. The 8282 can also be used in 8080/8085-systems replacing the 8212. If O̅E̅ (Output Enable) is connected to GND, the chip is selected. STB (Strobe) is connected to the pin ALE (Address Latch Enable) of the processor and takes over the address data from the multiplexed address-/databus. The 8283 has the same functionality, but the data is inverted. In 1980 the Intel 8282 and I8282 (industrial grade) version was available for 5.55 USD and 16.25 USD in quantities of 100 respectively.

Intel 8282 is functionally identical to 74573 or 74373 octal latch, although the pinout differ slightly.

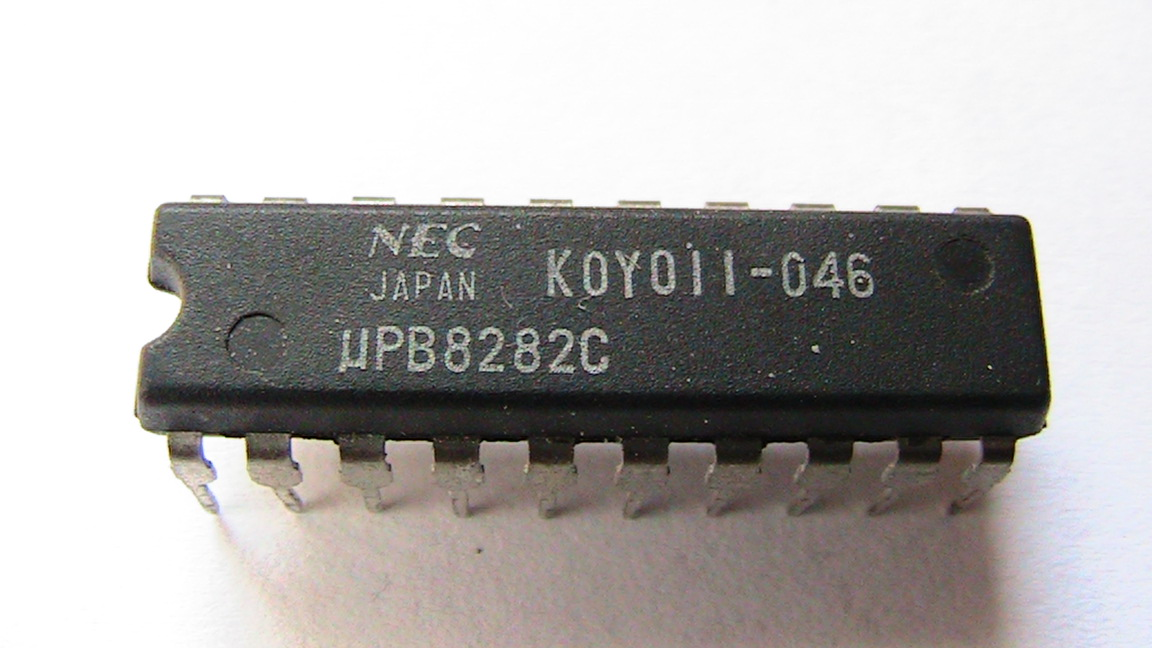
μPB8282C, NEC, Japan

== Literature and datasheets ==
- Datasheet (Intel): 8282/8283 Octal Latch
- NEC Electronics (Europe) GmbH, 1982 Catalog, p. 703–706 (μPB8282/83 8-Bit Latches)
