= Windows 2.0 =

1987 Microsoft operating system version

- Version of the Microsoft Windows operating system

- Screenshot of Windows 2.0
- Developer: Microsoft
- Working state: No longer supported
- Source model: Closed source
- Released to manufacturing: December 9, 1987; 38 years ago
- Final release: 2.03 / December 9, 1987; 38 years ago
- Kernel type: Monolithic (MS-DOS)
- License: Commercial software
- Preceded by: Windows 1.0 (1985)
- Succeeded by: Windows 2.1 (1988)

Support status
- Obsolete, unsupported as of December 31, 2001.

Windows 2.0 is a major release of Microsoft Windows, a family of graphical user shells and operating systems developed by Microsoft. It was released to manufacturing on December 9, 1987, as a successor to Windows 1.0.

The product includes two different variants: a base edition for 8086 real mode, and Windows/386, an enhanced edition for i386 protected mode. Windows 2.0 differs from its predecessor by allowing users to overlap and resize application windows, while the operating environment also introduced desktop icons, keyboard shortcuts, and support for 16-color VGA graphics. It also introduced Microsoft Word and Excel.

Noted as an improvement of its predecessor, Microsoft Windows gained more sales and popularity after the release of the operating environment, although it is also considered to still have been a work in progress. Due to the introduction of overlapping windows, Apple Inc. had filed a lawsuit against Microsoft in March 1988 after accusing them of violating copyrights Apple held; in the end, however, the judge ruled in favor of Microsoft. The operating environment was succeeded by Windows 2.1 in May 27, 1988, while Microsoft ended its support on December 31, 2001.

== Release versions ==
The operating environment came in two different variants with different names and CPU support. The basic edition supported the virtual 8086 mode of the 80386 microprocessor. Despite its configuration, the variant was fully operational on an 8088 or 8086 processor, although the high memory area would not be available on an 8086-class processor; however, expanded memory could still be used. IBM's PS/2 Model 25, which had an option to ship with a "DOS 4.00 and Windows kit" for educational markets, shipped Windows with 8086 hardware. The basic edition would be later renamed to Windows/286 with the release of Windows 2.1 in 1988.

The other variant, named Windows/386, was available as early as September 1987, pre-dating the release of Windows 2.0 in December 1987. It was much more advanced than its other sibling. It introduced a protected mode kernel, above which the GUI and applications run as a virtual 8086 mode task. The variant had fully preemptive multitasking, and allowed several MS-DOS programs to run in parallel in "virtual 8086" CPU mode, rather than always suspending background applications. With the exception of a few kilobytes of overhead, each DOS application could use any available low memory before Windows was started. Windows/386 also provided EMS emulation, using the memory management features of the i386 to make RAM beyond 640k behave like the banked memory previously only supplied by add-in cards and used by popular DOS applications. There was no support for disk-based virtual memory, so multiple DOS programs had to fit inside the available physical memory. Users could run more applications on the 386 version.

Neither of these versions worked with DOS memory managers like CEMM or QEMM or with DOS extenders, which have their own extended memory management and run in protected mode as well. This was remedied in version 3.0, which is compatible with Virtual Control Program Interface (VCPI) in "standard mode" and with DOS Protected Mode Interface (DPMI) in "386 enhanced" mode. Microsoft ended its support for Windows 2.0 on December 31, 2001.

== Features ==
Aldus PageMaker 3.0 on Windows 2.0

Unlike its predecessor, Windows 2.0 allows the user to overlap and resize application windows. It included desktop icons, keyboard shortcuts, and the terminology "minimize" and "maximize", as opposed to "iconize" and "zoom" which was used in Windows 1.0. Support for 16-color VGA graphics, EMS memory, and new capabilities of the i386 CPU in some versions were also added. Windows 2.0 is the last version of Windows that ran solely on floppy disks. There was also a version that supported SCSI, although it was only available to a few select businesses and no copy survives online.

The operating environment is shipped with fifteen programs, and it also introduced the GUI based programs Microsoft Word and Excel, to compete against the then-reigning competitors WordPerfect and Lotus 1-2-3. Software such as the Aldus PageMaker and CorelDRAW were also developed for Windows 2.0.

The Windows API functions are largely handled by KERNEL.EXE, USER.EXE, and GDI.EXE. These files along with device drivers, printer drivers being the exception, are combined by the Windows setup program into WIN200.BIN and WIN200.OVL. The system files WINOLDAP.MOD and WINOLDAP.GRB are used to run MS-DOS programs.

IBM licensed Windows's GUI for OS/2 as Presentation Manager, and the two companies stated that it and Windows 2.0 would be almost identical.

== System requirements ==
The official system requirements for Windows 2.0 include the following.

Minimum system requirements
	Windows 2.01	Windows 2.03
CPU	8088 processor (80286 or 80386 recommended)	
RAM	512 KB of memory (1024 KB with SCSI support)	
Storage	Two double-sided floppy disk drives or a hard disk (SCSI version only)	
Video	EGA or VGA adapters	
OS	MS-DOS 3.0 or higher	
Mouse	A Microsoft-compatible pointing device is recommended, but not required	

Windows 2.0 was dependent on the DOS system and random-access memory was restricted to a maximum of 1 MB due to running in real mode.

== Reception ==
Windows 2.0 is considered to be an incremental improvement of its predecessor, but still a work in process. Due to its improvements, Microsoft Windows gained more popularity after its release and its interface was considered to be easier to manage. Stewart Alsop II predicted in January 1988 that "Any transition to a graphical environment on IBM-style machines is bound to be maddeningly slow and driven strictly by market forces", because the GUI had "serious deficiencies" and users had to switch to DOS for many tasks. CNET considered that Windows 2.0 "wasn't much better than Windows 1.0". BYTE magazine listed the variant as among the "distinction" winner of the BYTE Awards in 1989, describing it as a "serious competition for OS/2" as it "taps into the power of the 80386".

The operating environment cost $99. Sales of Microsoft Windows reached one million in 1988, and by January 1990, it had reached less than two million, although Windows 2.0 was not widely used. It was succeeded by Windows 2.1, which was released in the United States and Canada in May 1988.

Chris Pratley of Microsoft wrote in 2004 that although "much better" than the "sort of a demo" version 1.0, 2.0 was too slow to use and limited in memory.

=== Legal conflict with Apple ===
On March 17, 1988, Apple Inc. filed a lawsuit against Microsoft and Hewlett-Packard, accusing them of violating copyrights Apple held on the Macintosh System Software. Apple claimed the "look and feel" of the Macintosh operating system, taken as a whole, was protected by copyright and that Windows 2.0 violated this copyright by having the same icons. The judge ruled in favor of Hewlett-Packard and Microsoft on all but 10 of the 189 graphical user interface elements on which Apple sued, and the court found the remaining 10 GUI elements could not be copyrighted.
