= Classic Windows =

Classic Windows are Microsoft Windows operating systems based on MS-DOS.

Classic Windows may refer to:

- Windows 1.0
- Windows 2.0
- Windows 2.1
- Windows 3.0
- Windows 3.1
- Windows 9x
