= Phar Lap Software =

Software company

Phar Lap Software, Inc.
- Industry: Software
- Founded: April 1986
- Defunct: September 21, 2000
- Fate: Acquired by VenturCom
- Headquarters: Cambridge, Massachusetts
- Key people: Richard M. Smith, Robert Moote, and John M. Benfatto
- Products: Development tools for DOS, DOS extenders
- Website: pharlap.com (archived)

Phar Lap Software, Inc., was a software company specializing in software development tools for DOS operating systems. The company was named after the champion New Zealand racehorse Phar Lap. They were most noted for their software allowing developers to access memory beyond the 640 KiB limit of DOS (DOS extenders) and were an author of the VCPI standard.

Phar Lap Software, Inc. was founded in April 1986 by Richard M. Smith, Robert Moote, and John M. Benfatto. Their first major success, 386|DOS-Extender, a 32-bit protected mode development tool, was released in November 1986.

Phar Lap’s product line was expanded to include 386|VMM, a virtual memory add-in driver, LinkLoc, a linker-locator for embedded development; cross tools for embedded development; and 286|DOS-Extender, a DOS extender that emulated an OS/2 environment, complete with the OS/2 API and protected mode, in contrast with Microsoft's OS/2 API emulation, which ran OS/2 applications in real mode and only supported a subset of the OS/2 API, called the Family API. Therefore, it was often bound with existing OS/2 applications, replacing Microsoft's OS/2 API emulation for those applications that needed access to extended memory in DOS. Later on the TNT DOS extender was created, which was a version of 386|DOS-Extender that emulated the Win32 environment, complete with flat address space and threading. Again this DOS extender was often bound to existing Win32 applications. MASM 6.1 and the 16-bit version of the Visual C++ 1.0 compiler were Win32 applications written for a beta version of Windows NT that was bound with the TNT DOS Extender. The Win32 executables referenced functions such as RtlExAllocateHeap in ntdll.dll, which did not exist in the final ntdll.dll, so if Windows even allowed you to run it (with a MajorSubsystemVersion of 3 it doesn't allow it in modern Windows), you would get an error about that function not being found. But a utility called Beta2Fix.exe could be run, which replaced the referenced to ntdll.dll to beta2.dll, then if you put the (provided) beta2.dll in your path, it would implement those old functions as calls to the new somewhat-equivalent new functions such as RtlAllocateHeap. This was fixed in MASM 6.11 and Visual C++ 1.5.

Phar Lap developed the Virtual Control Program Interface (VCPI) specification in cooperation with Quarterdeck Office Systems, who produced the DESQview task-switching software. Phar Lap was also a member of the 12-firm committee that designed the DOS Protected Mode Interface (DPMI). VCPI and DPMI are industry standards allowing DOS extenders to co-exist with expanded memory (EMS) emulators and multi-tasking environments.

Phar Lap received several major PC industry awards for VCPI, 386|DOS-Extender, and 286|DOS-Extender.

32-bit Windows applications could directly address all the memory the personal computer would support, so memory extenders were no longer needed.

Phar Lap is now part of IntervalZero, formerly Ardence, which produces, among other products, the Phar Lap ETS real-time operating system, used for instance on LabVIEW real-time targets.

== See also ==
- Fujitsu Towns OS, an MS-DOS adaptation combined with Phar Lap's RUN386.EXE
