= EMM386 =

Device driver in MS-DOS

- Developers: Microsoft, IBM, DR, Datalight, The FreeDOS team
- Initial release: 1988, 36–37 years ago
- Operating system: MS-DOS, PC DOS, DR DOS, ROM-DOS, FreeDOS
- Platform: Intel 80386
- Type: Expanded memory manager, Command

EMM386 is the expanded memory manager of Microsoft's MS-DOS, IBM's PC DOS, Digital Research's DR-DOS, and Datalight's ROM-DOS which is used to create expanded memory using extended memory on Intel 80386 CPUs. There also is an EMM386.EXE available in FreeDOS.

== Overview ==
EMM386.EXE can map memory into unused blocks in the upper memory area (UMA), allowing device drivers and terminate-and-stay-resident programs to be "loaded high", preserving conventional memory.

The technique probably first appeared with the development of CEMM, included with Compaq's OEM MS-DOS for the Compaq Deskpro 386 in 1986. Microsoft's version first appeared, built-in, with Windows/386 2.0 in 1987 and as standalone EMM386.SYS with MS-DOS 4.0 in 1988; the more flexible EMM386.EXE version appeared in MS-DOS 5.0 in 1991.

EMM386 uses the processor's virtual 8086 mode. This forces memory accesses made by DOS applications to go through the processor's MMU (introduced in the 386), and the page table entries used by the MMU are configured by EMM386 to map certain regions in upper memory to areas of extended memory (obtained by EMM386 through the extended memory manager HIMEM.SYS). This technique enabled both EMS (expanded memory) as well as UMBs - both of which appear to DOS applications to be memory in the upper area but are in fact mapped to physical memory locations beyond 1MB.

It temporarily shuts down during a Windows session in 386 Enhanced mode, with Windows' protected mode kernel taking over its role.

Windows uses the GEMMIS API to take over memory management from EMM386.EXE. Global EMM Import Specification (GEMMIS) is supported via a document available to a select number of memory-manager vendors ("Windows/386 Paging Import Specification").

Only a few memory managers implemented the GEMMIS API, some of the ones that include it are: EMM386.EXE, Quarterdeck QEMM, Qualitas 386MAX, Helix Netroom and DOSBox builtin DOS. Notably missing are FreeDOS's memory managers.

None of the FreeDOS memory managers (HIMEMX.EXE, JEMM386.EXE, JEMMEX.EXE) implement the GEMMIS API and Windows fails to start when running in conjunction with JEMMxxx since Windows fails to take over the memory management role. Windows ME, Windows 98, Windows 95, Windows for Workgroups 3.1x, and Windows 3.xx all will fail with JEMMxxx displaying:

 Cannot run Windows while the currently installed protected-mode software is
 running.

 Quit the protected-mode software, and then try again.
 You may need to restart your computer.

With JEMMxx, it is possible to run Windows 3.x and Windows for Workgroups 3.1x in limited capabilities by forcing Windows to use Standard Mode; i.e. using 80286 Protected Mode, not 80386 Enhanced Mode. Three conditions are required:

1. limit total XMS to 64MB
2. EMS must be enabled, can't use NOEMS option. For example JEMMEX X2MAX=65422
3. Windows operate in Standard Mode only, WIN /S or WIN /2

Note that Windows in standard mode is limited in functionality, it lacks virtual memory, it skips the [386Enh] section in SYSTEM.INI and any device drivers in [386Enh] are not loaded.

== History ==
EMM386 Version history
Bundled with	Date	Filename	Version
MS-DOS 4.01	November 1988	EMM386.SYS	4.00
Windows 3.0	May 1990	EMM386.SYS	4.10.0419
MS-DOS 5.0	June 1991	EMM386.EXE	4.20.06x
IBM PC DOS 5.0	June 1991	EMM386.EXE	4.20.06x
IBM PC DOS 5.02	September 1992	EMM386.EXE	4.33
MS-DOS 5.00a	November 1992	EMM386.EXE	4.33
Windows 3.1	April 1992	EMM386.EXE	4.44
Windows for Workgroups 3.1	October 1992	EMM386.EXE	4.44
MS-DOS 6.0	March 1993	EMM386.EXE	4.45
IBM PC DOS 6.1	June 1993	EMM386.EXE	4.45
MS-DOS 6.2	September 1993	EMM386.EXE	4.48
Windows 3.11	November 1993	EMM386.EXE	4.48
Windows for Workgroups 3.11	November 1993	EMM386.EXE	4.48
MS-DOS 6.21	March 1994	EMM386.EXE	4.48
IBM PC DOS 6.3	April 1994	EMM386.EXE	4.48
MS-DOS 6.22	June 1994	EMM386.EXE	4.49
IBM PC DOS 7.0	April 1995	EMM386.EXE	4.50
IBM PC DOS 2000	May 1998	EMM386.EXE	4.50
Windows 95	August 1995	EMM386.EXE	4.95
Windows 98	June 1998	EMM386.EXE	4.95

== See also ==
- Upper memory area (UMA)
- Extended memory (XMS)
- Expanded memory (EMS)
- List of DOS commands
