= Virtual DMA Services =

In computing, Virtual DMA Services (VDS) refer to an application programming interface that allow DOS and Win16 applications and device drivers to perform DMA operations while running under protected or virtual 8086 mode.
