= DOS extender =

Type of computer software program

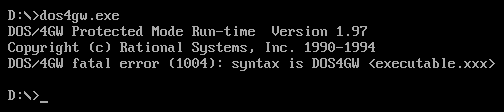
Tenberry Software's DOS/4GW startup banner

A DOS extender is a computer software program running under DOS that enables software to run in a protected mode environment even though the host operating system is only capable of operating in real mode.

DOS extenders were initially developed in the 1980s following the introduction of the Intel 80286 processor (and later expanded upon with the Intel 80386), to cope with the memory limitations of DOS.

== DOS extender operation ==
A DOS extender is a program that "extends" DOS so that programs running in protected mode can transparently interface with the underlying DOS API. This was necessary because many of the functions provided by DOS require 16-bit segment and offset addresses pointing to memory locations within the first 640 kilobytes of memory. Protected mode, however, uses an incompatible addressing method where the segment registers (now called selectors) are used to point to an entry in the Global Descriptor Table which describes the characteristics of the segment. The two methods of addressing are mutually exclusive, with the processor having to make costly switches to real (or V86) mode to service non-protected mode requests.

In addition to setting up the environment and loading the actual program to be executed, the DOS extender also provides (amongst other things) a translation layer that maintains buffers allocated below the 1 MB real mode memory barrier. These buffers are used to transfer data between the underlying real mode operating system and the protected mode program. Since switching between real/V86 mode and protected mode is a relatively time consuming operation, the extender attempts to minimize the number of switches by duplicating the functionality of many real mode operations within its own protected mode environment. As DOS uses interrupts extensively for communication between the operating system and user level software, DOS extenders intercept many of the common hardware (e.g. the real-time clock and keyboard controller) and software (e.g. DOS itself and the mouse API) interrupts. Some extenders also handle other common interrupt functions, such as video BIOS routines.

Essentially, a DOS extender is like a miniature operating system, handling much of the functionality of the underlying operating system itself.

== Development history ==
Tenberry Software's DOS/4G product logo

The DOS extender was arguably invented by Phar Lap, but it was Tenberry Software's (formerly Rational Systems) 386 extender DOS/4GW that brought protected mode DOS programs to a mass market. Included with Watcom's C, C++, and Fortran compilers for 386 class processors, it soon became a ubiquitous mainstay of PC applications and games such as id Software's successful Doom.

While initially it was the memory-hungry business applications that drove the development of DOS extenders, it would be PC games that truly brought them into the spotlight. As a result of the development of DOS extenders, two new software interfaces were created to take care of the many potential conflicts that could arise from the varied methods of memory management that already existed, as well as provide a uniform interface for client programs.

The first of these interfaces was the Virtual Control Program Interface (VCPI), but this was rapidly overshadowed by the DOS Protected Mode Interface (DPMI) specification, which grew from the Windows 3.0 development. They provided an API through which an extended program could interface with real mode software, allocate memory, and handle interrupt services. They also provided an easy method for the extender to set up the switch to protected mode, and allowed multiple protected mode programs to coexist peacefully.

== DOS extenders ==
- DOS/4G and DOS/4GW and DOS/16M by Tenberry Software, Inc.
- 286|DOS Extender and 386|DOS Extender by Phar Lap. Later superseded by the TNT Dos Extender.
- PROT by Al Williams, a 32-bit DOS extender published in Dr. Dobb's Journal and in two books. This extender had the virtue of running DOS and BIOS calls in emulated mode instead of switching back to real mode.
- CauseWay was a formerly proprietary extender that competed with DOS4G. As of 2000 it has been released as open source. A few rare games such as Daggerfall use it.
- DOS/32 as an alternative to DOS/4G by Narech K.
- Ergo (formerly Eclipse, formerly A. I. Architects) OS/286 and OS/386 extenders, and DPM16 and DPM32 servers
- 386Power 32-bit DOS Extender is an extender for 32-bit Assembly apps. Includes source code.
- all Microsoft Windows versions since 1990, except NT branch, include both a DPMI server and DOS extender.
- HX DOS Extender provides limited Win32 support to allow Windows console (like Far Manager) and some Win32 GUI applications to run under DOS. It contains both 16-bit and 32-bit DPMI servers (HDPMI16/HDPMI32) for use with protected mode DOS programs
- DosWin32 provides limited Win32 support
- WDosX was an early implementation of limited Win32 support, used by the TMT Pascal compiler.
- Borland Power Pack was an extender included with some of their development suites that could access a limited portion of the Win32 API.
- TASM, again from Borland, included 32RTM with DPMI32VM and RTM with DPMI16BI, two DPMI hosts.
- CWSDPMI by Charles W. Sandmann, a DPMI server for use with 32-bit protected mode DOS DJGPP programs.
- QDPMI by Quarterdeck Office Systems, was a DPMI host included with QEMM.
- GO32, used in older (pre-v2) versions of DJGPP, and Free Pascal
- D3X is an DPMI sever written entirely in Assembly. Still in alpha state, but discontinued before completion.
- DPMIONE is another DPMI sever. Originally developed for 32 bit programs generated by Borland C++ and Delphi.
- DBOS by Salford Software, a 32-bit protected mode DOS extender used primarily by their FTN77 Fortran Compiler
- X32 and X32VM by FlashTek and supported as a target by Digital Mars compilers
- BLINKER by Blink Inc Version 3 and above provided a 286 DOS Extender for several 16 bit DOS compilers including CA-Clipper, Microsoft C/C++, PASCAL, FORTRAN and Borland C/C++. Supported unique 'Dual Mode' executables capable of running in either real or protected mode depending on the run time environment.
- EMX
- PMODE/W, a 32-bit Protected DOS extender for Watcom C/C++ compiler, recently made open-sourced since July 2023.

== Notable DOS extended applications ==
- ATT Graphics Software Labs 'RIO' -- Resolution Independent Objects' graphics software.
- Adobe Acrobat Reader 1.0 (uses an early version of DOS/4GW professional)
- AutoCAD 11 (PharLap 386)
- Lotus 1-2-3 Release 3 (Rational Systems DOS/16M)
- Oracle Professional
- IBM Interleaf
- Major BBS, a 1980s BBS software package that utilized the Phar Lap DOS extender.
- Quarterdeck DESQview and DESQview/X multitasking software
- Watcom's C, C++ and Fortran compilers for the x86
- Countless DOS games from the early to mid 1990s, mostly using DOS/4GW, including:
  - id Software's DOOM and its sequels, as well as Quake (built with DJGPP)
  - Looking Glass Studios' System Shock
  - Parallax Software's Descent
  - Crack dot Com's Abuse
  - Blizzard Entertainment's Warcraft: Orcs & Humans and Warcraft II: Tides of Darkness
  - 3D Realms' Duke Nukem 3D
  - Midway's Mortal Kombat
  - Westwood Studios' Command & Conquer and Command & Conquer: Red Alert
  - DMA Design (now Rockstar North)'s Grand Theft Auto. Later versions of the game were ported to Windows in order to make it more compatible with modern computers.
  - Comanche: Maximum Overkill by NovaLogic used a custom Unreal mode memory manager which required a 80386 processor and was incompatible with memory managers and virtual DOS boxes, requiring a complicated DOS boot menu configuration in CONFIG.SYS. Later revisions included a DOS extender which solved the problem.
  - Ultima VII and Ultima VII Part Two: Serpent Isle by Origin Systems also used a custom Unreal mode memory manager called the Voodoo Memory Manager which was incompatible with EMS memory and memory managers such as EMM386.
