= QEMM =

Memory manager produced by Quarterdeck Office Systems

Quarterdeck Expanded Memory Manager (QEMM)
- Developer: Quarterdeck Office Systems
- Stable release: QEMM 97 (aka v9.0) / May 15, 1997; 29 years ago
- Operating system: DOS
- Type: DOS memory manager

Quarterdeck Expanded Memory Manager (QEMM) is a memory manager produced by Quarterdeck Office Systems in the late 1980s through the late 1990s. It was the most-popular third-party memory manager for the MS-DOS and other DOS operating systems.

== QEMM product ranges ==
QRAM
A memory manager for Intel 80286 or higher CPUs. It supports Chips and Technologies chipsets. 2.02 added SHADOWRAM switch. QEXT correctly reallocates eXtended Memory Specification (XMS). It includes VIDRAM, Optimize, LOADHI from QEMM 6.02, Manifest 1.13. Earlier versions of QRAM also supported the older 8086 and 8088 CPUs.

QEMM Game Edition
It is a version of QEMM that includes Quarterdeck GameRunner. Patches for regular QEMM do not work on QEMM Game Edition.

QEMM MegaBundle
In the version shipped with Borland SideKick for Windows, it is a version with SideBar 1.00 (1994-08-22) and QEMM 7.5.

DESQview 386
It includes DESQview and QEMM-386.

== Features/tools ==
=== QEMM driver ===
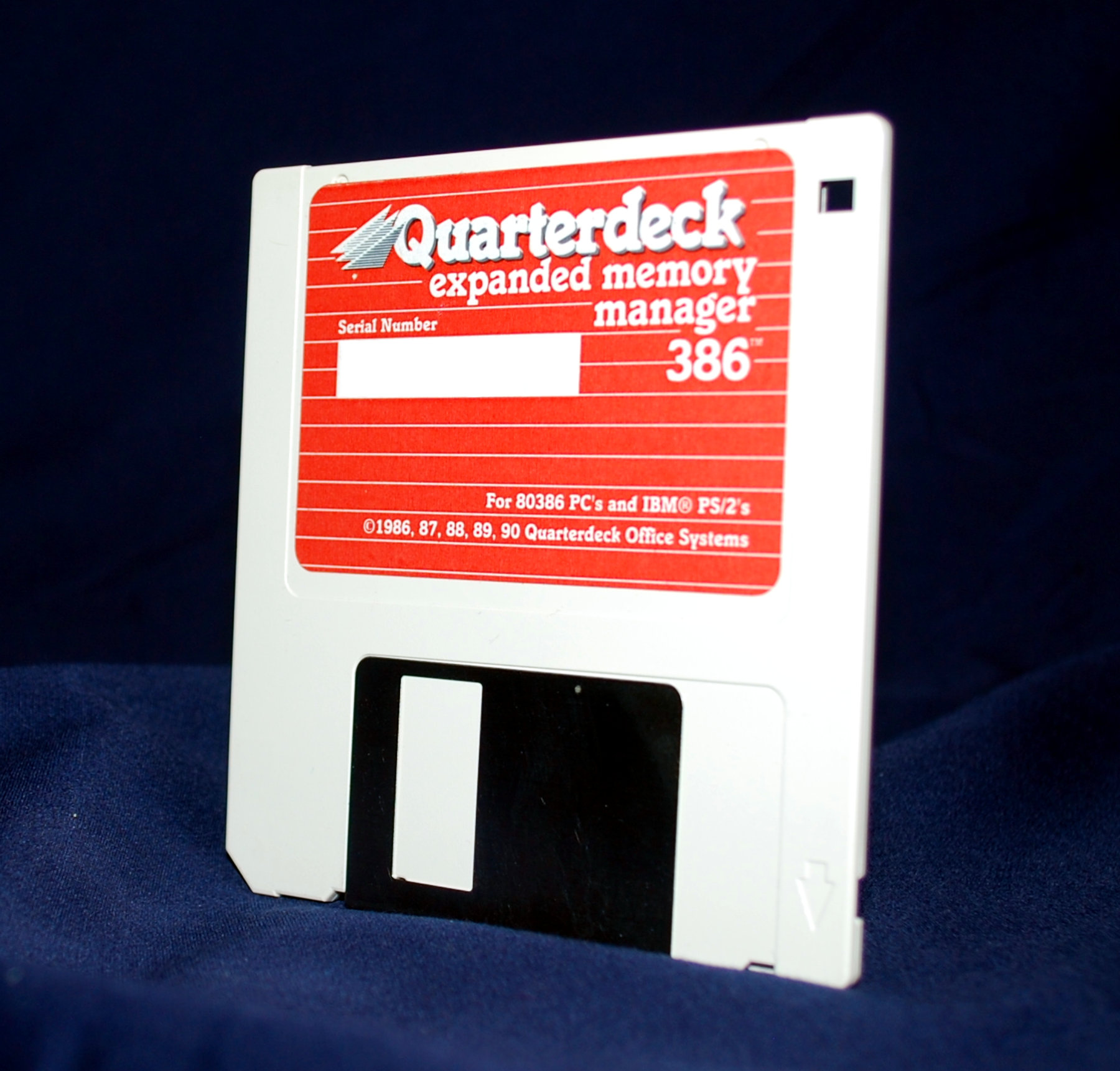
QEMM for 80386 and IBM PS/2 personal computers

QEMM provides access to the Upper Memory Area (UMA) and memory through the Expanded Memory Specification (EMS), Extended Memory Specification (XMS), Virtual Control Program Interface (VCPI) and DOS Protected Mode Interface (DPMI).

- Quickboot: It allows a form of warm reboot or local reboot to be performed without going through the BIOS. It will therefore completely bypass the POST, including the BIOS startup screen and the time-consuming memory test and device enumeration, and just restore the CPU state and interrupts to their initial state after POST.

=== DOS-Up ===
It relocates DOS kernel, COMMAND.COM interpreter, DOS resources (e.g.: buffers, file handles, stacks, lastdrive). It supports DOS 3.2 or higher.

=== HOOKRAM ===
It allows drivers to be loaded before loading QEMM and still allow the use of QEMM's Stealth feature.

=== MagnaRAM ===
It was a virtual memory compression utility for Windows 3.1, Windows for Workgroups and Windows 95. MagnaRAM is included with QEMM 97.

MagnaRAM was also released as a separate utility.

MagnaRAM worked by replacing a portion of Windows' virtual memory system. MagnaRAM would insert itself in the string of Windows Programs that determined what pieces of RAM will be moved to the hard disk. Instead of writing directly to the hard disk, the information to be written would go to MagnaRAM's own buffer as this was a faster process. During CPU idle, MagnaRAM would compress the information in its own RAM buffer. When the RAM buffer becomes full, it is then swapped to the hard disk taking both less time and less space.

=== Manifest ===
Manifest (MFT) is a hardware information utility that displays information about user's system.

- 1.11 fixed minor cosmetic bugs.
- 1.12 can identify PS/2 Model 57SX, Compaq Deskpro 486s/16M, Sharp MZ-100. Available EMS in System Overview screen was corrected when using Stealth.
- 1.13 fixed Award BIOS identification problem.
- Version 2.0 provides information on network, enhance reporting of video capabilities, APM, DPMI/VCPI/EMS/XMS memory. New feature include editing DOS and Windows boot configuration files.

=== Optimize ===
Similar to MEMMAKER, it is a utility that calculates, and allows user to choose optimal orders of loading drivers and TSRs. However, OPTIMIZE allows preview of adjustments be made without rebooting. Shipped with QEMM and DESQview.

=== QDPMI ===
QDPMI is a DPMI 0.9 server driver, authored by Dan Spear. It requires 386 CPU and QEMM386.

=== QEMM 50/60 ===
It is a version of QEMM driver for the IBM PS/2 Models 50 and 60.

Version 4.03 supports IBM Memory Expansion Option boards with 2-8MB memory.

=== Stealth ===
It can relocate memory assigned for CGA character set away from UMA.

Beginning with QEMM version 8, it allows ROM contents in UMA to be relocated to provide more memory for TSRs. Additional Stealth Windows compatibility is provided with VxDs.

=== Stealth DoubleSpace/D*Space ===
Stealth D*Space allows DoubleSpace or DriveSpace to be loaded high.

=== T386 ===
It allows Toshiba laptops to work with QEMM's EMS manager.

=== VIDRAM ===
- Provides extra conventional memory in text mode programs, by reclaiming buffers located in UMA that are used in graphics modes.
- It requires EGA/VGA-compatible video card.
- VIDRAM EMS supports DMA-based video memory access at the expense of EMS memory for buffer.

=== Limitations ===
==== Device driver limit ====
LOADHI.SYS loads up to 1 device driver at a time in QEMM 4.23, 2 in QEMM 5, 32 in QEMM 6.

==== MagnaRAM limit ====
Maximum compression threshold setting is 100% for all versions of MagnaRAM 2.00-2.02, except for MagnaRAM 2.00 included with QEMM 8.00, which has the maximum setting of 80%.

==== Memory limit ====
- QEMM 5.0 can manage up to 16 MB EMS, 16 MB XMS.
- QEMM 6.0 can manage up to 64 MB EMS, 64 MB XMS.
- QEMM 6.02 can manage up to 128 MB EMS, 128 MB XMS. EMBMEM (16-bit) parameter limit was removed.
- QEMM 7.0-7.03 can manage up to 128 MB EMS, 128 MB XMS.
- QEMM 7.04, 7.5, 8.0-8.3 and 97 (aka QEMM 9.0) can manage up to 256 MB EMS/XMS.

By default, QEMM 7.04 and above provide up to a total of 64 MB RAM shared among XMS, EMS and VCPI memory, unless the USERAM= parameter is used. For example, to allow access to up to 256 MB EMS (or 256 MB XMS), specify: QEMM386.SYS USERAM=1M-256M

For QEMM 7.04 and above, the maximum addressable RAM is 256 MB of memory, shared among XMS, EMS and VCPI memory. Initially, XMS allocates the entire 256 MB and shares it with EMS and VCPI as needed, that is, as EMS and VCPI request memory blocks, XMS free memory is reduced by that same amount.

==== Optimize limit ====
Versions up to QEMM 6.01 can process batch files up to 9KB, and 20KB in QEMM 6.02.

Batch file line limit is 512 for QEMM versions up to 6.02.

==== Stealth DoubleSpace/D*Space ====
Stealth D*Space does not support Windows 95 or later versions of DriveSpace.

== Version history ==
Originally, the product was called QEMM-386 (requiring an Intel 80386 and DOS 3.30.), and was released with a complementary product called QRAM (for use on intel 80286 and 8088). The 386 suffix was dropped starting with QEMM version 7.0 in 1993, when Intel released the Intel Pentium on March 22, 1993. The final release was re-branded as QEMM 97 to follow Microsoft's new branding trend of using year released instead of version numbers, specifically, Windows 95 and Windows 95 OSR2.

=== QEMM-386 v4.2 (November 11, 1988) ===
- Supported Intel 80386 and DOS 3.30.
- Bundled with QRAM for 80286 or 8088/8086 computers.

=== QEMM-386 v5.0 (January 1990) ===
- Added support for Intel 80486, DOS 4.01 and Windows 3.0.
- Maximum RAM is 16MB XMS/16MB EMS.
- LOADHI.SYS now loads 2 device drivers at a time.
- New QEMM parameters include COMPAQ386S (C386S).

=== QEMM-386 v5.11 (mid 1990) ===
- Added support for Virtual DMA Services (VDS).
- Supported larger memory cache.

=== QEMM-386 v6.0 (early 1991) ===
- Added support for DOS 5.00a and Windows 3.0a.
- Maximum RAM is 64MB XMS/64MB EMS.
- New features include Stealth.
- New utilities include HOOKRAM.
- LOADHI.SYS now loads 32 device drivers at a time.
- Manifest was updated to 1.10.
- QRAM updated to 2.02 for intel 80286 and intel 8088 systems.

=== QEMM-386 v6.01 (mid 1991) ===
- QEMM supports loading XMS driver before QEMM, running Stealth in Windows 3.0 in 386 Enhanced mode.
- Optimize support indented CALL statements in batch files.
- Manifest was updated to 1.11.

=== QEMM-386 v6.02 (November 13, 1991) ===
- Supports 2.88MB floppy drives.
- New Optimize switches include /COMMANDFILE (CMD), /LOADLOW (LOW), /QUICK (Q). Optimize supports default OPTIMIZE.EXC exclusion file.
- New QEMM parameters include DISKBUFFRAME=xx (DBF), EXCLUDESTEALTHINT=xx (XSTI), SHADOWRAM=xxx (SH), UNMAPFREEPAGES=Y/N (UFP), WINSHRINKUMBS=N (WSU).
- By default, EMS is un-mapped when Stealth is active.
- Optimize can support batch file up to 20KB.
- The 64MB limit was removed from EMBMEM (EMB) parameter.
- TESTBIOS' 'Danny and Larry' messages were removed.
- Manifest was updated to 1.13.
- Vidram now support systems with over 640KB conventional memory, uses EMS by default.

=== QEMM v7.0 (mid 1993) ===
Dropped the 386 suffix from the name since Intel introduced the Pentium processor.

- Added support for Intel Pentium, DOS 6.00 and Windows 3.10.
- Maximum RAM is 128MB XMS/128MB EMS.
- QEMM was rewritten with 32-bit code.
- New features include DOSDATA, DOS-Up, Stealth ROM, Stealth DoubleSpace.
- New utilities include SWAPECHO.COM, OPTIMIZE.EXE (replaced OPTIMIZE.COM), QDPMI (Quarterdeck DPMI 0.9 host), QSETUP (QEMM Setup for Windows), SCANMEM.COM (USERAM= memory scanner).
- Updated utilities include Manifest 2.0. Add support of Virtual Mode Extensions and Page Size Extensions found in Pentium, later Intel 80486, or later CPUs; Bus-Mastering hard drives. Improved adapter RAM detection.
- Added support for reading qemm configuration file, @filename.
- Added support for DOS 6.00 Multi-Config in CONFIG.SYS, IF statements in AUTOEXEC.BAT.
- Optimize supports disk compression software.
- Vidram can now operate in Windows Enhanced mode DOS windows.
- QEMM 7.0x loads itself to shadow RAM by default.

==== QEMM v7.03 (November 17, 1993) ====
- VIDRAM no longer suppress interrupt 10, function 1B calls (Video BIOS Functionality and State Information for MCGA/VGA).
- New Optimize switches include /NOFLUSH (/NOFL).
- Stealth DoubleSpace virtualizes DOS Function 9.
- DOSDATA improves compatibility with Stacker 3.1, supports PC DOS 6.1 and XTRADRIVE or OS/2 2.x Boot Manager.
- Stealth Windows driver was updated to 7.02.
- QEMM driver now supports Compaq 20/e and 25/e.

==== QEMM v7.04 (February 28, 1994) ====
- Added support for DOS 6.20.
- Maximum RAM is 256MB XMS/256MB EMS.
- DOS-Up now supports Novell DOS 7. In DR DOS 6.0 and Novell DOS 7, only DOS resource is loaded high.
- Improved VCPI compatibility on systems with large amounts of memory.
- QEMM supports DESQview/X 2.0 server.*Manifest now recognizes STB processors.

=== QEMM v7.5 (September 17, 1994) ===
- New features include Stealth D*Space which supports both drive compression techniques, DrvSpace (DOS 6.22) and DblSpace (DOS 6.20-DOS 6.00); replacing Stealth DoubleSpace.
- New tools include QPI.VXD.
- Improved Pentium support with DigiSpeech Portable Sound parallel port sound card. QEMM 7.5 no longer loads itself to shadow RAM. Optimize now properly detects hardware on system with network card.

=== QEMM v7.53 (May 12, 1995) ===
- Added support for DOS 6.22, Windows 3.11 and Windows for Workgroups 3.11.
- Maximum RAM is 256MB XMS/256MB EMS.
- Improved OPTIMIZE so it finds EMS in hardware detection phase.

=== QEMM v8.0 (1995-11-04) ===
- Attempted to support Windows 95.
- Updated MagnaRAM 2.02.
- QEMM v8.0 did not take full advantage of the new capabilities of Windows 95. It simply acted as if it was Windows 3.11 and relied on Windows 95 being downward compatible with Windows 3.1x. Quarterdeck attempted to better integrate v8.x with Windows 95 with patch v8.01 and the final patch v8.03.

=== QEMM v8.01 (February 14, 1996) ===
- Improved support for Windows 95 and under-laying DOS 7.00.
- Added 4DOS.CMD.

=== QEMM v8.03 (April 7, 1997) ===
- Full support for pure DOS 6.22 with Windows 3.11 or Windows for Workgroups 3.11.
- Bug fixes including improvements to QEMM386, DOS-Up, LOADHI.
- Final official patch to QEMM v8.x (March 25, 1997) back-ports many improvements from soon-to-be released QEMM 97.

=== QEMM 97 (aka v9.0) (May 15, 1997) ===
- Full support for Windows 95/98/98SE (not ME).
- QEMM v8.03 lacks capabilities under Windows 95 (And doesn't work with Windows 98).
- New utilities include MagnaRAM, optimizing Windows 9x paging file.

==== One Install.exe but two roles ====
- Run the installer from within Windows, and it will fully integrate QEMM 97 with Windows configuration files and registry updating system.ini, adding QEMM group, auto starting QEMM monitoring, etc.
- However, run the installer, install.exe, from a pure DOS (DOS 7.10 or DOS 6.22) without Windows present, and it will configure and install only the DOS utilities; updating only DOS' config.sys and autoexec.bat files.

== QEMM Configurations ==
QEMM provides up to 635K free conventional memory (RAM under 640K), far better than pure MS-DOS EMM386, FreeDOS JEMM386, UMBPCI and many other memory manager programs. QEMM maximum RAM is 635K free conventional memory with up to 256MB XMS/256MB EMS shared.

=== MS-DOS 6.22, Windows 3.11/WFW 3.11 ===
MS-DOS 6.22 provides 619K free conventional memory and up to 64MB XMS/32MB EMS shared RAM. Assuming unaltered MS-DOS 6.22, without 3rd party utilities, i.e. JEMM, UMBPCI, etc. QEMM increases the available free conventional RAM to 635K with shared 256MB XMS/256MB EMS.

While using Windows 3.11 or Windows For Workgroups 3.11, QEMM provides additional free conventional memory for DOS Prompt running under Windows. QEMM is well suited for Windows 3.x as has supported for it since QEMM v5.x as early as 1990. As a result, QEMM 8.03 or QEMM 97 integrate very well with Windows 3.11/WFW 3.11.

=== MS-DOS 7.10, Windows 95 OSR2/Windows 98 SE ===
QEMM increases the available free conventional RAM for MS-DOS 7.10 and also for DOS Prompt under Windows 95 OSR2/Windows 98 SE. However, QEMM maximum RAM is a shared 256MB XMS/256MB EMS, which is less than what DOS 7.10 and Windows 95/98 support without QEMM. MS-DOS 7.10 provides 624K free conventional memory and up to 1GB XMS/32MB EMS; assuming unaltered MS-DOS, using HIMEM.SYS and EMM386.EXE without any 3rd party utilities. Thus, QEMM is compatible with MS-DOS 7.10 and Windows 9x and provides slightly more free conventional RAM but it does lower the maximum RAM to 256MB XMS/256MB EMS.

=== Consequences of using or disabling EMS ===
EMS memory normally uses a 64KB of UMB as the Page Frame, this reduces the total UMB available to DOS. So some recommend turning off EMS, using the NOEMS switch, to increase the total UMB free by 64KB. QEMM supports NOEMS switch, however, it is far better to provide EMS than saving the 64K Page Frame.

QEMM takes advantage of EMS memory and usually will create more free RAM in the lower 1M address space than the 64KB required for EMS. QEMM StealthROM, SqueezeFrame, and Stealth D*Space all require EMS to work by mapping ROM and data buffers into EMS, thus freeing more UMB's.

Thus any advice to remove the page frame is penny-wise and pound-foolish. Remember that the page frame is 64K of address space that can be used any program, at any time, to access effectively as much memory as it likes. Some view the page frame as 64K of address space that could be used to hold up 64K of programs, but it is much more useful to consider the page frame as a place to access up to 32 megabytes of code and/or data for the programs that use it.

— QEMM's TechNote FRAME.TEC

=== Example: 635K Free, shared 256MB XMS/256MB EMS ===
DOS=HIGH,UMB
device=C:\QEMM\dosdata.sys
device=C:\QEMM\qemm386.sys R:1 RAM UR=1M-256M ST:M I=b000-b7ff X=f000-ffff
device=C:\QEMM\dos-up.sys @C:\QEMM\dos-up.dat
shell=C:\QEMM\loadhi.com /R:2 C:\command.com C:\ /P /E:1024

Note: If using VMware, then replace the qemm386.sys line with

device=C:\QEMM\qemm386.sys R:1 RAM UR=1M-256M X=e800-e900

=== Skipping QEMM386 while booting ===
Hold ALT key during boot and qemm386.sys will not load but prompt to hit Esc to skip loading.

Alternatively, hold F5 so DOS skips loading all of config.sys + autoexec.bat or hold F8 so DOS prompt Y/N to confirm each line in config.sys and autoexec.bat; allowing you to skip loading qemm386.sys, dos-up, dosdata, etc.

This helps while testing new configuration that lead to system lockups. Holding ALT or pressing F5/F8 during boot can prevent lockups.

== DOS equivalents ==
Microsoft released comparable but simpler memory managers of its own - HIMEM.SYS for XMS and EMM386.EXE for EMS with MS-DOS 4.01 in 1989; earlier Windows/386 2.1 included a built-in EMM which offered EMS to DOS windows during Windows sessions only. These versions could not yet create Upper Memory Blocks. Digital Research's DR DOS 5.0 (1990) was the first non-vendor-specific DOS to offer the UMB technology, incorporating a 386-mode XMS/EMS manager also called EMM386. It could also allocate some of the video memory or EMS memory as UMB memory.

MS-DOS finally offered UMBs in 1991 with version 5.0. MS-DOS' EMM386 required HIMEM to be loaded first, while DR-DOS' EMM386 fulfilled both roles and did not need a separate XMS driver, which was still provided but only needed on 80286-based machines (originally named HIDOS.SYS, later HIMEM.SYS). If an XMS driver was loaded before DR-DOS EMM386, it would use this instead of the built-in XMS manager. Using an external and possibly customized XMS driver could help overcome issues with BIOS memory reporting functions causing the memory manager not to see all available memory, and on machines using non-standard gate-A20 switching methods, whereas using the internal XMS driver EMM386 could take advantage of speed-optimized 32-bit code for the XMS driver and relocate all but a tiny stub of the XMS driver into Extended Memory. DR-DOS EMM386 could fill "free" areas with UMBs or map RAM over unused ROM areas in virtual mode, provide support for DPMI (and - in some special issues - DPMS), and load the support for pre-emptive multitasking and multithreading components of the operating system.

== Windows transition / Decline of QEMM ==
While popular when DOS programs were the mainstream, QEMM eventually became largely irrelevant as Windows programs and more intensive DOS programs, particularly games, using DOS extenders replaced traditional DOS programs for most users. Also, some of the DOS users switched to protected mode operating systems unsupported by QEMM, such as the Windows NT series and Linux.

The final version was QEMM 97, which was compatible with Windows 95 and later Windows 98/ME, but by this point, not only was DOS memory management no longer in high demand, but the remaining competitive DOS applications (including various GNU utilities and text editors) supported EMS, XMS, or DPMI - which reduced demand for conventional memory - or had been ported to Windows 95 or higher. The availability of increasing RAM sizes at low cost served to reduce the need of MagnaRAM. Finally, modern PCI chipsets provide documented functionality to remove write protection from unused UMA; in many or most cases, this last fact eliminates the need for QEMM for even those relatively few users who use DOS applications and who might otherwise find QEMM essential.

== See also ==
- Real mode
- Unreal mode
- Protected mode
- Conventional memory
- Extended memory (XMS)
- Expanded memory (EMS)
- High Memory Area (HMA)
- Upper Memory Block (UMB)
- DOS Protected Mode Interface (DPMI)
- 640k barrier
- DESQview
