= Appendix H =

Appendix H is an infamous appendix in Pentium Processor Family Developer's Manual, Volume 3. This appendix contained reference to documentation only available under a legally binding NDA.

This NDAed documentation described various new features introduced in the Pentium processor, notably Virtual Mode Extensions (VME) and 4 MB paging. VME added an additional feature to the existing virtual 8086 mode (which was introduced with the 80386 processor), and included optimized handling and delivery of interrupts to and from virtual machines by reducing the number of traps required. VME should not be confused with the later Intel VT virtualization technology aiming at full virtualization of the CPU, rather than just the 8086 mode.

The appendix was referenced by the official chapters in the documentation, provoking irritation among the public who was not allowed to access the detailed descriptions. This started a movement with observers trying to reverse-engineer the information in various ways. Notably, Robert Collins (writing in Dr. Dobb's Journal) and Christian Ludloff (owner of the sandpile.org website) played a major role in this. From the Pentium Pro, the information in Appendix H was moved to the main documentation chapters, making the features publicly documented.

== See also ==
- Virtual 8086 Mode Enhancements (VME)
- VME (CONFIG.SYS directive) (in OS/2)
- QEMM
