= EMX (programming environment) =

POSIX-compatible programming environment for DOS and OS/2

Eberhard Mattes eXtender (EMX)
- Other names: emx+gcc
- Original author: Eberhard Mattes
- Stable release: emx 0.9d / 1998; 28 years ago
- Written in: C, Assembly language
- Operating system: MS-DOS, OS/2
- Type: Programming environment
- License: GPL-2.0-or-later
- Website: sourceforge.net/projects/emx/

EMX (Eberhard Mattes eXtender; also known as emx+gcc) is a programming environment for MS-DOS and OS/2. It allows creating and executing of 32-bit mode applications, presenting a POSIX API and, on OS/2, access to the OS/2 APIs.

== Contents ==
The EMX package consists of:

- The emx.exe program, a DOS extender, that allows running a 32-bit mode application and emx.dll and helper dlls in single threaded (for MS-DOS compatibility) and multithreaded forms for running under OS/2.
- A C library that provides a POSIX API, for use on both DOS and OS/2.
- Additional libraries for OS/2.
- Ports of the C and C++ compilers of GNU GCC, the GNU binutils, gdb, GNU make, and other tools for program development.
- Tools for creating OS/2 shared libraries.

== History ==
The latest version is emx 0.9d, released in 1998 and last updated in March 2001.

== See also ==
- Cygwin
- DJGPP
- MinGW
