= Program Manager =

Graphical shell for early Windows systems

- Program Manager in Windows for Workgroups 3.11
- Developer: Microsoft
- Operating system: Windows 3.x, Windows NT 3.1, Windows NT 3.5, OS/2
- Predecessor: MS-DOS Executive
- Successor: Windows Shell
- Type: Shell

Program Manager is the shell of Windows 3.x and Windows NT 3.x operating systems. This shell exposed a task-oriented graphical user interface (GUI), consisting of icons (shortcuts for programs) arranged into program groups. It replaced MS-DOS Executive, a file manager, as the default Windows shell.

OS/2 2.0 and later included the Program Manager as part of its Win-OS/2 compatibility layer. Win-OS/2, including the Program Manager, are still included in later derivatives of OS/2 such as ArcaOS.

== Overview ==
Program Manager descends from Desktop Manager (also known as Presentation Manager), the shell for OS/2 1.2. Unlike Desktop Manager, which presents its program groups in a simple list, and opens each group in a separate window, Program Manager opens program groups in child windows using the new multiple document interface in Windows 3.x. The icons used to represent Program Manager itself, program groups, and DOS applications in Windows 3.0 are carried over from OS/2 1.2. Windows 3.1 uses updated versions of these icons.

When executables were dropped into Program Manager from File Manager, Program Manager automatically used the executable's default icon embedded as data inside the .EXE file. Additionally, the Windows Setup program, which populated Program Manager with the standard icons of a fresh install, could also be used to add new icons in bulk after installation. Using SETUP /P from the command line, a standard layout could be installed on many machines in an enterprise using a single SETUP.INF configuration file.

Beginning with Windows 3.1, Program Manager contained a StartUp group. Programs and files placed into that group would be loaded when Windows starts.

Holding down the shift key while selecting File then Exit Windows will save the current configuration of Program Manager to PROGMAN.INI, including the position of all program group icons, assuming that auto-arrange has been disabled. This allowed Microsoft testers to try many different configurations, but the feature remained in the shipped version.

In later versions of Microsoft Windows, starting with Windows 95 and Windows NT 4.0, Program Manager was replaced by Windows Shell. The Start menu, the Desktop, and the Taskbar took over program organization and launching duties.

Program Manager was still included in later versions of Windows, and could be accessed by executing PROGMAN.EXE from the command line or Run dialog. It could be used as the default shell by specifying the Shell value in Windows Registry at either HKLM\SOFTWARE\Microsoft\Windows NT\CurrentVersion\Winlogon (per machine) or HKCU\SOFTWARE\Microsoft\Windows NT\CurrentVersion\Winlogon (per user).

Microsoft replaced Program Manager in Windows XP Service Pack 2 with a compatibility stub that simply redirects to Windows Explorer. Since the release of Windows Vista, PROGMAN.EXE has been permanently removed from the operating system. However, the auxiliary file MORICONS.DLL, introduced in Windows 3.1 to store icons that did not fit within the Program Manager executable, still exists as of Windows 11.

== See also ==
- Presentation Manager
- Windows shell replacement
