= Tenberry Software =

Phoenix software company, developer of DOS/4GW and DOS/4G protected-mode extenders

- Formerly: Rational Systems
- Company type: Private
- Industry: Software, DOS extenders
- Headquarters: Phoenix, Arizona, United States
- Key people: Terence Colligan (president)
- Products: DOS/16M, DOS/4G, DOS/4GW

Tenberry Software, formerly Rational Systems, was a software company based in Phoenix, Arizona, best known for developing DOS/4G and DOS/4GW, DOS extenders that became a de facto standard for running 32-bit software under 16-bit MS-DOS in the early 1990s. The company also developed DOS/16M, an earlier extender that enabled 16-bit applications to access extended memory beyond the conventional 640 KB limit.

== History and products ==
Rational Systems developed DOS/16M and then DOS/4G, one of the first commercial DOS extenders enabling software to run in protected mode on Intel 80386 and later processors while booting from MS-DOS. DOS extenders were essential during the early 1990s because DOS itself could not directly address memory above 1 MB; a protected-mode extender allowed applications to bypass this constraint and access several megabytes of RAM, which was important for memory-intensive programs such as games, compilers and engineering tools.

Watcom licensed DOS/4G and bundled a royalty-free run-time version, DOS/4GW, with its Watcom C/C++ compiler. Developers who compiled software with Watcom C/C++ could distribute DOS/4GW freely with their products. This arrangement made DOS/4GW ubiquitous in the PC games market of the early-to-mid 1990s: titles including Doom, Quake, Duke Nukem 3D and numerous others shipped with DOS/4GW, making its startup message — "DOS/4GW Protected Mode Run-Time" — familiar to a generation of PC gamers.

The company renamed itself Tenberry Software in the mid-1990s. President Terence Colligan was involved with the company through this period.

== See also ==
- Phar Lap
