= DESQview =

Text mode multitasking operating environment

- DESQview 2.8 running on top of MS-DOS 6.22 in VirtualBox
- Developer: Quarterdeck Office Systems
- Release: July 1985; 41 years ago
- Final release: DESQview/2.80
- Operating system: DOS
- Type: Windowing system
- License: Proprietary commercial software

DESQview (DV) is a text mode multitasking operating environment released by Quarterdeck Office Systems in 1985 which enjoyed modest popularity in the late 1980s and early 1990s. Running on top of DOS, it allows users to run multiple programs concurrently in multiple windows.

DESQview/X (DVX), released in 1992, had a graphical user interface.

== Desq ==
Quarterdeck's predecessor to DESQview was a task switching product called Desq (shipped late April or May 1984), which allows users to switch between running programs. Quarterdeck revamped its package, bringing multitasking in, and adding TopView compatibility.

DESQview was released in July 1985, four months before Microsoft released the first version of Windows. It was widely thought to be the first program to bring multitasking and windowing capabilities to DOS; in fact, there was a predecessor, IBM TopView, which shipped March 1985.

Under DESQview, well-behaved DOS programs can be run concurrently in resizable, overlapping windows (something the first version of Windows cannot do). A simple hideable menu allows cutting and pasting between programs. DESQview provides support for simple editable macros as well. Quarterdeck also developed a set of optional utilities for DESQview, including a notepad and dialer. Later versions allow graphics mode programs to be loaded as well, but only run in full screen mode.

DESQview is not a GUI (graphical user interface) operating system. Rather, it is a non-graphical, windowed shell that runs in real mode on top of DOS, although it can run on any Intel 8086- or Intel 80286-based PC. It can also use expanded memory add-ons to work around the 640 KB RAM limit of conventional memory on early PCs. DESQview really came into its own on Intel 80386 machines, which are better at utilizing memory above DOS's limit. However, in either case, it runs in real mode rather than protected mode, meaning that a misbehaving program can still crash the system.

== DESQview and QEMM ==
To make maximum use of extended memory on Intel 80386 processors, by transforming it into expanded memory and upper memory blocks (UMBs) accessible to DESQview and other real-mode programs, Quarterdeck developed a sophisticated memory manager. Owing to the foresight of its marketing manager, Quarterdeck marketed it as a separate product, QEMM-386 (Quarterdeck Expanded Memory Manager 386). It became more popular than DESQview itself, and sold steadily for many years, generating over US$150 million in sales from 1987 through 1994. After the release of the Intel Pentium processor, the 386 in QEMM was dropped. The combination package of DESQview and QEMM-386 was called DESQview 386 (DV386).

With the introduction of the 80386, the memory management features were enhanced to allow the system to shift into protected mode but also allow the addresses to be configured in a virtual 8086 mode so that the extended memory can be mapped into addressing frames and accessible to real-mode programs such as DOS. This allows a 386 to implement the LIM (Lotus, Intel, Microsoft) EMS (expanded memory specification). The memory manager is easily controlled by the user with DOS program QEMM.COM.

DESQview is able to use QEMM's features far beyond just the LIM EMS API, mapping most of the "conventional" address space (below 640 KB) into multiple extended memory blocks such that each can execute transparently during its context. The main copy of DOS and any device and networking drivers have to be loaded before DESQview. The resulting space is the largest single program that can run, but DESQview under QEMM can run as many instances of those programs as the EMS allows. So an 8 MB system can generally have a dozen full-sized DOS programs running concurrently; a 16 MB system can run over twenty, and so on.

== DESQview usage ==
DESQview was noteworthy in that it supported all common DOS-compatible programs and achieved a degree of performance and stability, given the constraints of its host operating system. It also has a user interface that is designed to minimise visual clutter while being designed to be easy to learn.

All normal PCs include a keyboard with three "shift" or "modifier" keys: Control, Alt, and the normal Shift keys. These keys are normally held down in combination with other keys. DESQview, by default, monitors the Alt key for isolated presses (not in combination). Pressing the Alt key by itself brings up the DESQview menu allowing access to the program's features: start new tasks, switch among them, mark text on the screen, paste text as input into the current task, resize or move the text windows, configure new menu items, etc. In addition a Shift+Alt combination causes DESQview to learn a set of keys as a macro. This allows DESQview to run other programs without interfering with any of the "keybindings" they might be using.

DESQview was critically acclaimed and won many fans, but it never met with mass appeal, despite Quarterdeck's sustained efforts to win people over.

In one area, however, DESQview was a lasting success: many multiuser bulletin board systems were based on it, thanks to its modest hardware requirements, robust multitasking, and superlative handling of multiple communication ports. Most free or inexpensive BBS software of the time ran as a single-node, single-tasking DOS program. Normally, only one copy of the BBS software could run at once, limiting the host PC to running one node. DESQview, often aided by the installation of 16550 UART chips that buffer, allows multiple copies of the same single-tasking BBS software to run simultaneously on a single computer, resulting in a multi-user BBS.

== Decline of DESQview ==
DESQview does not provide a graphical user interface (GUI). While Quarterdeck did provide suites of programming libraries and utilities to support the development of software to use its features, these never became widely popular. DESQview's ability to run most software with no modification and the cost of "run-time" licenses, combined with the costs of the development suites themselves made this an unreasonable combination for commercial shrink-wrapped software publishers and vendors.

Microsoft released Windows 3.0 with its own memory management and multitasking features. While DESQview was far faster, smaller, and more stable, it was more expensive and didn't include support for the graphical features of MS Windows.

The decline of QEMM started with the bundling of a memory manager in Digital Research's DR DOS 5.0, released in 1990. To catch on, Microsoft included its own EMM386 in MS-DOS 5.0, while previously the memory management functionality was only available with Windows. QEMM could still be used instead, notably with Windows 3.1x, but only for incremental benefit. Sales of QEMM declined. In August 1994, after three quarters of losses, the company laid off 25% of their employees and the CEO, president, and founder Terry Myers resigned.

As users moved from DESQview to other platforms, notably Windows 3.x and OS/2, third party utility authors wrote utility programs that emulated some DESQview API functions to allow suitably equipped DOS programs to co-operate with these OS. The most notable are TAME (for Windows) and OS/2SPEED (for OS/2).

=== DESQview/X ===
Quarterdeck eventually also released a product named DESQview/X (DVX), which is an X Window System server running under DOS and DESQview and thus provides a GUI to which X software (mostly Unix) could be ported.

DESQview/X had three window managers that it launched with, X/Motif, OPEN LOOK, and twm. The default package contained only twm, the others were costly optional extras, as was the ability to interact on TCP/IP networks. Mosaic was ported to DVX.

DVX itself can serve DOS programs and the 16-bit Windows environment across the network as X programs, which made it useful for those who wished to run DOS and Windows programs from their Unix workstations. The same functionality is available with some versions of NCD Wincenter.

=== NetWare Access Server ===
Internetworking company Novell developed a product called NetWare Access Server (NAS) incorporating features of DESQview 386 and pcAnywhere. The DESQview multitasking support was used to create an environment into which up to 16 PC and Macintosh clients can login remotely to access NetWare services and run DOS applications.

=== DESQview after X ===
DESQview development continued in parallel with DESQview/X. After ceasing development on DESQview/X, another version of DESQview was released. QEMM was still developed after the discontinuation of DESQview, and a version compatible with Windows 98 was released.

In the mid-1990s, Quarterdeck tried to recast itself as an Internet company, releasing a version of the Mosaic web browser. Eventually, the company was acquired by Symantec.

== Reception ==
BYTE in 1984 stated that DesQ's application compatibility was the highest of the five window managers tested. The magazine's Jerry Pournelle in 1989 noted that "while MultiFinder doesn't work very well yet, DESQView on a big 80386 machine certainly does", and preferable to OS/2 on 286. The magazine that year listed version 3.0 as among the "Distinction" winners of the BYTE Awards, stating that "unlike OS/2, DESQview lets you run the programs you've already paid for ... Many users will find that DESQview is all they need".

== See also ==
- GNU Screen
- IBM TopView
- MultiFinder
- tmux
- Terminal multiplexer
- Twin (windowing system)
