= Presentation Manager =

Graphical user interface

Presentation Manager (PM) is the graphical user interface (GUI) that IBM and Microsoft introduced in version 1.1 of their operating system OS/2 in late 1988.

== History ==
The original Presentation Manager running on OS/2 1.1

Microsoft began developing a graphic user interface (GUI) in 1981. After it persuaded IBM that OS/2 also needed a GUI, Presentation Manager (PM; codenamed Winthorn) was co-developed by Microsoft and IBM's Hursley Lab in 1987–1988. It was a cross between Microsoft Windows and IBM's mainframe graphical system (GDDM). Like Windows, it was message based and many of the messages were even identical, but there were a number of significant differences as well. Although Presentation Manager was designed to be very similar to the upcoming Windows 2.0 from the user's point of view, and Presentation Manager application structure was nearly identical to Windows application structure, source compatibility with Windows was not an objective. For Microsoft, the development of Presentation Manager was an opportunity to clean up some of the design mistakes of Windows. The two companies stated that Presentation Manager and Windows 2.0 would remain almost identical.

One of the most significant differences between Windows and PM was the coordinate system. While in Windows the 0,0 coordinate was located in the upper left corner, in PM it was in the lower left corner. Another difference was that all drawing operations went to the Device Context (DC) in Windows. PM also used DCs but there was an added level of abstraction called Presentation Space (PS). OS/2 also had more powerful drawing functions in its Graphics Programming Interface (GPI). Some of the GPI concepts (like viewing transforms) were later incorporated into Windows NT. The OS/2 programming model was thought to be cleaner, since there was no need to explicitly export the window procedure, no WinMain, and no non-standard function prologs and epilogs.

=== Parting ways ===
The Presentation Manager style in OS/2 1.2 and 1.3 influenced the design of Windows 3.0.

One of the most-cited reasons for the IBM–Microsoft split was the divergence of the APIs between Presentation Manager and Windows, which was probably driven by IBM. Initially, Presentation Manager was based on Windows GUI code, and often had developments performed in advance, like the support for proportional fonts (later supported in Windows in 1990). One of the divergences regarded the position of coordinate (0,0), which is at the top-left in Windows, but at bottom-left (as in Cartesian coordinates) in Presentation Manager. In practice it became impossible to recompile a GUI program to run on the other system; an automated source code conversion tool was promised. Both companies were hoping that at some point users would migrate to OS/2.

In 1990, version 3.0 of Windows was beginning to sell in volume, and Microsoft began to lose interest in OS/2 especially since, even earlier, market interest in OS/2 was always much smaller than in Windows.

The companies parted ways, and IBM took over all of subsequent development. Microsoft took OS/2 3.0, which it renamed Windows NT; as such, it inherited certain characteristics of Presentation Manager. IBM continued to develop Presentation Manager. In subsequent versions of OS/2, and derivatives such as ArcaOS, it was used as a base for the object-oriented interface Workplace Shell.

There is a significant integration of the GUI layer with the rest of the system, but it is still possible to run certain parts of OS/2 from a text-console or X window, and it is possible to boot OS/2 into a command-line environment without Presentation Manager (e.g. using TSHELL).

=== Presentation Manager for Unix ===
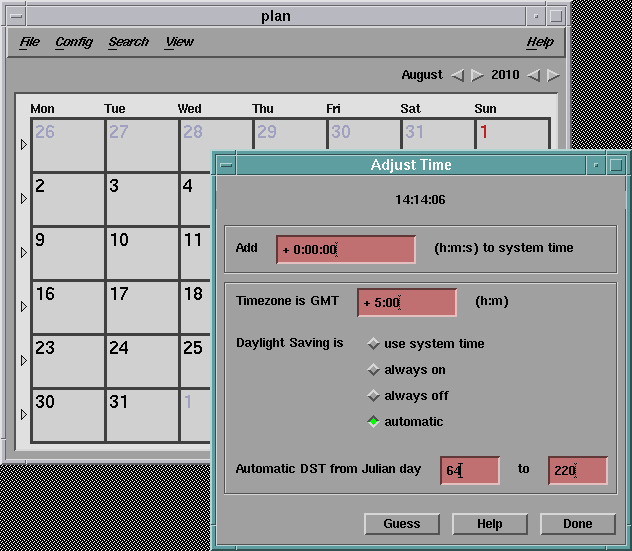
Motif was directly inspired by the look and feel of the Presentation Manager interface.

In the late 1980s, Hewlett-Packard and Microsoft collaborated on an implementation of Presentation Manager for Unix systems running the X11 windowing system. The port consisted of two separate pieces of software - a toolkit, window manager and style guide named CXI (Common X Interface) and an implementation of the Presentation Manager API for Unix named PM/X. Both CXI and PM/X were submitted to the Open Software Foundation for consideration as OSF's new user interface standard for Unix, which eventually became Motif. OSF ultimately selected CXI, but used Digital Equipment Corporation's XUI API instead of PM/X. Microsoft and HP continued the development of PM/X for some time after the release of Motif, with Microsoft integrating the product into a joint development strategy with SCO to bring a common user interface to OS/2 and SCO's Unix products, but it was ultimately abandoned.

== Technical details ==
PM follows the Common User Access interface conventions. It also supports mouse chording for copying and pasting text.

An important problem was that of the single input queue: a non-responsive application could block the processing of user-interface messages, thus freezing the graphical interface. This problem has been solved in Windows NT, where such an application would just become a dead rectangle on the screen; in later versions it became possible to move or hide it. In OS/2 it was solved in a FixPack, using a timer to determine when an application was not responding to events.

== See also ==
- Program Manager
