= 386MAX =

Software for memory management on DOS computers

386^{MAX} (originally 386 to the Max, later Qualitas MAX) is a computer memory manager for DOS-based personal computers. It competed with Quarterdeck's QEMM memory manager. It was manufactured by Qualitas.

BlueMax was a special version designed for the IBM PS/2 with ROM compression to get the most of the Upper Memory Blocks.

In 2022, the source code was made available on GitHub, and released under the GNU GPL v3 license by Bob Smith of Sudley Place Software. It joined other tools that Smith had originally written at Qualitas which had their source code released in 2012:

- DPMIONE, a DPMI 1.0 host component
- 386SWAT, a protected-mode debugger
- QLINK, a linker tool written to handle 32-bit data types, in support of the 386SWAT program

== See also ==
- MSDPMI
