= DOS/4G =

Software program expanding DOS memory

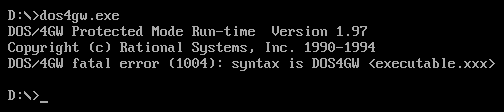
- Developer: Tenberry Software
- Initial release: July 1991; 34 years ago
- Final release: 2.01 / April 3, 1996; 29 years ago
- Operating system: DOS
- Platform: IA-32
- Type: DOS extender
- License: Proprietary
- Website: web.archive.org/web/20180628103312/tenberry.com/dos4g

DOS/4G is a 32-bit DOS extender developed by Rational Systems (later Tenberry Software). It allows DOS programs to eliminate the 640 KB conventional memory limit by addressing up to 64 MB of extended memory on Intel 80386 and above machines.

== Features ==
Functioning as a highly flexible and reusable memory extension library, DOS/4G allowed programmers to access extended memory without writing specialized code. It embeds itself in the executable file at linking time and executes before main application code, so usually DOS/4G initialization messages show up at launch. It can in principle operate within MS-DOS, PC DOS, DR-DOS and other DOS clones, the DOS boxes of OS/2, Microsoft Windows, Windows NT and Windows 95, and DOS emulators such as DOSBox. However, in practice few DOS/4G games or other applications will run on non-DOS-based versions of Windows, including Windows NT, Windows 2000 and Windows XP, since none of these allow direct access to the hardware as was used for display rendering in those days.

== History ==
Rational Systems first announced DOS/4G in July 1991. It was available immediately, at a price of US$5000 and up.

DOS/4GW 1.95 was a free limited edition of DOS/4G and was included with the Watcom C compiler with a commercial re-distribution license. It was made widely popular by computer games like Doom or Tomb Raider.

Initial versions of DOS/4G had trouble with secondary DMA channels on the ISA bus, which prevented 16-bit devices like Gravis Ultrasound series from normally functioning; Gravis even had to develop PREPGAME, a patch utility which updated the game executable with a new version 1.97 to fix the incompatibility.

In case of problems, DOS/4G or DOS/4GW can be replaced with the newer and free DOS/32; a patch utility can even replace DOS/4G code embedded inside a compiled executable file.

== See also ==
- DOS/32
- DOS Protected Mode Interface (DPMI)
- DOS API
