= Windows 2.1 =

1988 Microsoft operating system version

- Version of the Microsoft Windows operating system

- Screenshot of Windows 2.1
- Developer: Microsoft
- Working state: No longer supported
- Source model: Closed source
- Released to manufacturing: May 27, 1988; 38 years ago
- Final release: 2.11 / March 13, 1989; 37 years ago
- Kernel type: Monolithic (MS-DOS)
- License: Commercial software
- Preceded by: Windows 2.0 (1987)
- Succeeded by: Windows 3.0 (1990)

Support status
- Obsolete, unsupported as of December 31, 2001.

Windows 2.1 is a release of Microsoft Windows, a family of graphical user shells and operating systems. It was released to manufacturing on May 27, 1988, as a successor to Windows 2.0.

It was released with two different variants with differing CPU compatibility, also known as Windows/286 and Windows/386, so the versions are considered to be similar to its predecessor. In comparison, the Windows/386 variant is considered to be better than Windows/286, since it provides support for EMS emulation and is designed to use both conventional and extended memory. Changes to the user interface did not occur in this version, and rather, its performance was increased and enhanced memory management was added. The version is also noted to be the first one to require a hard disk drive. A minor update version, Windows 2.11, was released in March 1989.

Enhancements that were introduced were considered to have improved the operating environment, while the Windows/386 variant was noted to have a good level of functionality. It was considered to be one of the most popular 80386-based systems. The sales of Microsoft Windows continued to go up after its release, and in May 22, 1990, it was succeeded by Windows 3.0, which is considered to be the first Windows version to perform well both critically and commercially. Microsoft ended its support on December 31, 2001.

== Release versions ==
=== Windows 2.1 ===
Like its predecessor, Windows 2.0, the operating environment was released with two different variants with differing CPU compatibility. However, the cosmetic naming convention was changed to "Windows/286" and "Windows/386". It was released on May 27, 1988, and it was the first version of Windows to require a hard disk drive.

Despite its name, Windows/286 did not require a 80286 processor and was fully operational on an 8088 or 8086 processor, although it would not use the high memory area since the latter lacked the feature. It is a rehash of its predecessor, Windows 2.03. The variant uses an additional 64 KB of the extended 80286 memory in real mode. To access the additional memory, HIMEM.SYS is needed. A few PC vendors shipped Windows/286 with Intel 8086 hardware; one such example was IBM's PS/2 Model 25, which included Windows/286, resulting in some customer confusion.

The other variant, Windows/386, is more advanced since it had introduced a protected mode kernel, and it allows several MS-DOS programs to run in parallel in the virtual 8086 mode of the 80386 processor, rather than suspending background applications. It has also provided support for EMS emulation, to use RAM beyond the 640 KB limit. It has spruced-up rendering of the 80386 version, and its setup program is considered to be better than the Windows/286 one. Windows/386 is designed to use both conventional and extended memory, although it ignores expanded memory. The facilities for converting extended memory into expanded memory are built into Windows/386, although, any EMS that is separately controlled would not be available on Windows/386. To customize Windows/386, users would have to manually change the CONFIG.SYS file. Microsoft ended its support for Windows 2.1 on December 31, 2001.

A Korean version of Windows 2.1 was published by Microsoft in May 1990. It was re-released in September 1990 as Windows 2.12.

=== Windows 2.11 ===
Windows 2.11 was released on March 13, 1989. As the successor of Windows 2.1, it was also released in Windows/286 and Windows/386 editions, with some minor changes in memory management and updates regarding printing options. It was noted that costs for organizations that ran Windows 2.11 were lower.

== Features ==
Changes to the user interface did not occur in this version; instead, Microsoft had increased its performance and added enhanced memory management. The Windows/286 variant introduced LIM 4.0 boards to store and swap executable code. Both variants had also introduced support towards more devices, while its printer support has been improved. Windows/386 allows sharing a single printer to multiple windows. Microsoft has also introduced a disk-caching program, SmartDrive, while third-party developers had introduced more apps to Windows 2.1 and 2.11.

== System requirements ==
The official system requirements for Windows 2.1 include the following:

	Windows/286	Windows/386
CPU	8086 processor (80286 recommended)	80386 processor
RAM	512 KB of memory	1 MB of memory
Storage	A hard disk	2 MB of hard disk space
Video	EGA or VGA adapters (works with CGA)	
OS	MS-DOS 3.0 or higher	MS-DOS 3.1 or higher
Mouse	A Microsoft-compatible pointing device is recommended, but not required	

Windows 2.1 is shipped with 1.2 MB 5¼-inch or 720K 3½-inch floppy disks. The Windows/386 variant also comes with user's guides, a quick-reference card and a manual that explains the features of the 386 variant.

== Reception ==
The enhancements that were introduced in Windows 2.1 are considered to have improved the operating environment. The Windows/386 variant has good level of functionality, and it lets applications run in full- or partial-screen windows, while the operating environment also slows down when running graphic-based applications. InfoWorld rated Windows/386 an excellent value. Alongside DESQview 386, they were considered to be the most popular 386 environments by 1989, although DESQview 386 is considered to be more flexible than Windows/386. Compared to other 80386-based systems, Windows/386 requires less DOS memory.

The price tag for Windows/286 sat at $99, while the Windows/386 variant cost $195. By January 1990, the sales of Microsoft Windows had reached less than two million. It was succeeded by Windows 3.0 released in 1990, and after that, Windows 3.1 in 1992. Windows 2.1 is considered to be the first version of Microsoft Windows to perform well both critically and commercially.

== See also ==
- LOADALL
