= Protected mode =

Operational mode of x86-compatible CPUs

In computing, protected mode, also called protected virtual address mode, is an operational mode of x86-compatible central processing units (CPUs). It allows system software to use features such as segmentation, virtual memory, paging and safe multi-tasking designed to increase an operating system's control over application software.

When a processor that supports x86 protected mode is powered on, it begins executing instructions in real mode, in order to maintain backward compatibility with earlier x86 processors. Protected mode may only be entered after the system software sets up one descriptor table and enables the Protection Enable (PE) bit in the control register 0 (CR0).

Protected mode was first added to the x86 architecture in 1982, with the release of Intel's 80286 (286) processor, and later extended with the release of the 80386 (386) in 1985. Due to the enhancements added by protected mode, it has become widely adopted and has become the foundation for all subsequent enhancements to the x86 (IA-32) architecture, although many of those enhancements, such as added instructions and new registers, also brought benefits to the real mode.

== History ==
The first x86 processor, the Intel 8086, had a 20-bit address bus for its memory, as did its Intel 8088 variant. This allowed them to access 2^{20} bytes of memory, equivalent to 1 megabyte. At the time, 1 megabyte was considered a relatively large amount of memory, so the designers of the IBM Personal Computer reserved the first 640 kilobytes for use by applications and the operating system and the remaining 384 kilobytes for the BIOS (Basic Input/Output System) and memory for add-on devices.

As the cost of memory decreased and memory use increased, the 1 MB limitation became a significant problem. Intel intended to solve this limitation along with others with the release of the 286.

=== The 286 ===
The initial protected mode, released with the 286, was not widely used; for example, it was used by Coherent (from 1982), Microsoft Xenix (around 1984) and Minix. Several shortcomings such as the inability to make BIOS and DOS calls due to inability to switch back to real mode without resetting the processor prevented widespread usage. Acceptance was additionally hampered by the fact that the 286 allowed memory access in 64 kilobyte segments, addressed by its four segment registers, meaning that only 4 × 64 KB, equivalent to 256 KB, could be accessed at a time. Because changing a segment register in protected mode caused a 6-byte segment descriptor to be loaded into the CPU from memory, the segment register load instruction took many tens of processor cycles, making it much slower than on the 8086 and 8088; therefore, the strategy of computing segment addresses on-the-fly in order to access data structures larger than 128 kilobytes (the combined size of the two data segments) became impractical, even for those few programmers who had mastered it on the 8086 and 8088.

The 286 maintained backward compatibility with the 8086 and 8088 by initially entering real mode on power up. Real mode functioned virtually identically to the 8086 and 8088, allowing the vast majority of existing software for those processors to run unmodified on the newer 286. Real mode also served as a more basic mode to set up and bootstrap into protected mode. To access the extended functionality of the 286, the operating system would set up some tables in memory that controlled memory access in protected mode, set the addresses of those tables into some special registers of the processor, and then set the processor into protected mode. This enabled 24-bit addressing, which allowed the processor to access 2^{24} bytes of memory, equivalent to 16 megabytes.

=== The 386 ===
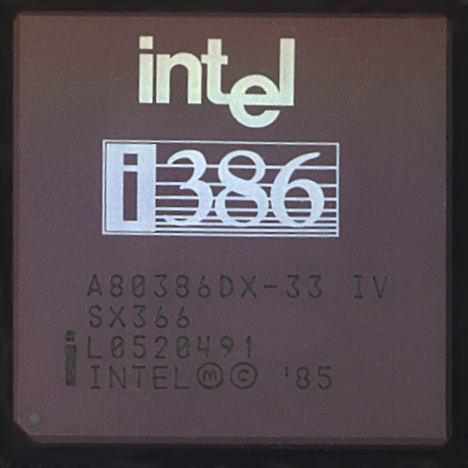
An Intel 80386 microprocessor

With the release of the 386 in 1985, many of the issues preventing widespread adoption of the previous protected mode were addressed. The 386 was released with an address bus size of 32 bits, which allows for 2^{32} bytes of memory accessing, equivalent to 4 gigabytes. The segment sizes were also increased to 32 bits, meaning that the full address space of 4 gigabytes could be accessed without the need to switch between multiple segments. In addition to the increased size of the address bus and segment registers, many other new features were added with the intention of increasing operational security and stability. Protected mode is now used in virtually all modern operating systems which run on the x86 architecture, such as Microsoft Windows, Linux, and many others.

Furthermore, learning from the failures of the 286 protected mode to satisfy the needs for multitasking DOS applications, Intel added a separate virtual 8086 mode, which allowed multiple virtualized 8086 processors to be emulated on the 386. Hardware x86 virtualization required for virtualizing the protected mode itself, however, had to wait for another 20 years.

== 386 additions to protected mode ==
With the release of the 386, the following additional features were added to protected mode:

- Paging
- 32-bit physical and virtual address space (The 32-bit physical address space is not present on the 80386SX, and other 386 processor variants which use the older 286 bus.)
- 32-bit segment offsets
- Ability to switch back to real mode without resetting
- Virtual 8086 mode

== Entering and exiting protected mode ==
Until the release of the 386, protected mode did not offer a direct method to switch back into real mode once protected mode was entered. IBM devised a workaround (implemented in the IBM AT) which involved resetting the CPU via the keyboard controller and saving the system registers, stack pointer and often the interrupt mask in the real-time clock chip's RAM. This allowed the BIOS to restore the CPU to a similar state and begin executing code before the reset. Later, a triple fault was used to reset the 286 CPU, which was a lot faster and cleaner than the keyboard controller method.

To enter protected mode, the Global Descriptor Table (GDT) must first be created with a minimum of three entries: a null descriptor, a code segment descriptor and data segment descriptor. Then, the PE bit must be set in the CR0 register and a far jump must be made to clear the prefetch input queue. Also, on an IBM-compatible machine, in order to enable the CPU to access all 16 MB of the address space (instead of only the 8 even megabytes), the A20 line (21st address line) must be enabled. (A20 is disabled at power-up, causing each odd megabyte of the address space to be aliased to the previous even megabyte, in order to guarantee compatibility with older software written for the Intel 8088-based IBM PC and PC/XT models). Enabling A20 is not strictly required to run in protected mode; the CPU will operate normally in protected mode with A20 disabled, only without the ability to access half of the memory addresses.

; MASM program
; enter protected mode (set PE bit)
mov EBX, CR0   ; save control register 0 (CR0) to EBX
or EBX, PE_BIT ; set PE bit by ORing, save to EBX
mov CR0, EBX   ; save EBX back to CR0

; clear prefetch queue; (using far jump instruction jmp)
jmp CLEAR_LABEL
CLEAR_LABEL:

With the release of the 386, protected mode could be exited by loading the segment registers with real mode values, disabling the A20 line and clearing the PE bit in the CR0 register, without the need to perform the initial setup steps required with the 286.

== Features ==
Protected mode has a number of features designed to enhance an operating system's control over application software, in order to increase security and system stability. These additions allow the operating system to function in a way that would be significantly more difficult or even impossible without proper hardware support.

=== Privilege levels ===
Example of privilege ring usage in an operating system using all rings

In protected mode, there are four privilege levels or rings, numbered from 0 to 3, with ring 0 being the most privileged and 3 being the least. The use of rings allows for system software to restrict tasks from accessing data, call gates or executing privileged instructions. In most environments, the operating system and some device drivers run in ring 0 and applications run in ring 3.

=== Real mode application compatibility ===
According to the Intel 80286 Programmer's Reference Manual,

the 80286 remains upwardly compatible with most 8086 and 80186 application programs. Most 8086 application programs can be re-compiled or re-assembled and executed on the 80286 in Protected Mode.

For the most part, the binary compatibility with real-mode code, the ability to access up to 16 MB of physical memory, and 1 GB of virtual memory, were the most apparent changes to application programmers. This was not without its limitations. If an application utilized or relied on any of the techniques below, it would not run:

- Segment arithmetic
- Privileged instructions
- Direct hardware access
- Writing to a code segment
- Executing data
- Overlapping segments
- Use of BIOS functions, due to the BIOS interrupts being reserved by Intel

In reality, almost all DOS application programs violated these rules. Due to these limitations, virtual 8086 mode was introduced with the 386. Despite such potential setbacks, Windows 3.0 and its successors can take advantage of the binary compatibility with real mode to run many Windows 2.x (Windows 2.0 and Windows 2.1x) applications in protected mode, which ran in real mode in Windows 2.x.

=== Virtual 8086 mode ===
With the release of the 386, protected mode offers what the Intel manuals call virtual 8086 mode. Virtual 8086 mode is designed to allow code previously written for the 8086 to run unmodified and concurrently with other tasks, without compromising security or system stability.

Virtual 8086 mode, however, is not completely backward compatible with all programs. Programs that require segment manipulation, privileged instructions, direct hardware access, or use self-modifying code will generate an exception that must be served by the operating system. In addition, applications running in virtual 8086 mode generate a trap with the use of instructions that involve input/output (I/O), which can negatively impact performance.

Due to these limitations, some programs originally designed to run on the 8086 cannot be run in virtual 8086 mode. As a result, system software is forced to either compromise system security or backward compatibility when dealing with legacy software. An example of such a compromise can be seen with the release of Windows NT, which dropped backward compatibility for "ill-behaved" DOS applications.

=== Segment addressing ===
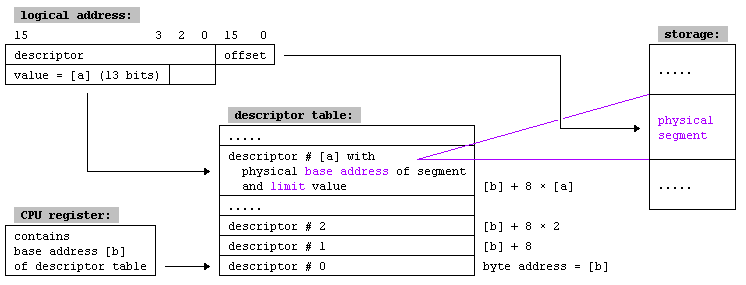
Virtual segments of 80286

==== Real mode ====
In real mode each logical address points directly into a physical memory location, every logical address consists of two 16-bit parts: The segment part of the logical address contains the base address of a segment with a granularity of 16 bytes, i.e. a segment may start at physical address 0, 16, 32, ..., 2^{20} − 16. The offset part of the logical address contains an offset inside the segment, i.e. the physical address can be calculated as physical_address = segment_part × 16 + offset, if the address line A20 is enabled, or (segment_part × 16 + offset) mod 2^{20}, if A20 is off. Every segment has a size of 2^{16} bytes.

==== Protected mode ====
In protected mode, the segment_part is replaced by a 16-bit selector, in which the 13 upper bits (bit 3 to bit 15) contain the index of an entry inside a descriptor table. The next bit (bit 2) specifies whether the operation is used with the GDT or the LDT. The lowest two bits (bit 1 and bit 0) of the selector are combined to define the privilege of the request, where the values of 0 and 3 represent the highest and the lowest privilege, respectively. This means that the byte offset of descriptors in the descriptor table is the same as the 16-bit selector, provided the lower three bits are zeroed.

The descriptor table entry defines the real linear address of the segment, a limit value for the segment size, and some attribute bits (flags).

==== 286 ====
The segment address inside the descriptor table entry has a length of 24 bits so every byte of the physical memory can be defined as bound of the segment. The limit value inside the descriptor table entry has a length of 16 bits so segment length can be between 1 byte and 2^{16} byte. The calculated linear address equals the physical memory address.

==== 386 ====
The segment address inside the descriptor table entry is expanded to 32 bits so every byte of the physical memory can be defined as bound of the segment. The limit value inside the descriptor table entry is expanded to 20 bits and completed with a granularity flag (G-bit, for short):

- If G-bit is zero limit has a granularity of 1 byte, i.e. segment size may be 1, 2, ..., 2^{20} bytes.
- If G-bit is one limit has a granularity of 2^{12} bytes, i.e. segment size may be 1 × 2^{12}, 2 × 2^{12}, ..., 2^{20} × 2^{12} bytes. If paging is off, the calculated linear address equals the physical memory address. If paging is on, the calculated linear address is used as input of paging.

The 386 processor also uses 32 bit values for the address offset.

For maintaining compatibility with 286 protected mode a new default flag (D-bit, for short) was added. If the D-bit of a code segment is off (0) all commands inside this segment will be interpreted as 16-bit commands by default; if it is on (1), they will be interpreted as 32-bit commands.

==== Structure of segment descriptor entry ====
- 80286 Segment descriptor
^{3}_{1}	^{3}_{0}	^{2}_{9}	^{2}_{8}	^{2}_{7}	^{2}_{6}	^{2}_{5}	^{2}_{4}	^{2}_{3}	^{2}_{2}	^{2}_{1}	^{2}_{0}	^{1}_{9}	^{1}_{8}	^{1}_{7}	^{1}_{6}	^{1}_{5}	^{1}_{4}	^{1}_{3}	^{1}_{2}	^{1}_{1}	^{1}_{0}	^{0}_{9}	^{0}_{8}	^{0}_{7}	^{0}_{6}	^{0}_{5}	^{0}_{4}	^{0}_{3}	^{0}_{2}	^{0}_{1}	^{0}_{0}
Base[0..15]																Limit[0..15]
^{6}_{3}	^{6}_{2}	^{6}_{1}	^{6}_{0}	^{5}_{9}	^{5}_{8}	^{5}_{7}	^{5}_{6}	^{5}_{5}	^{5}_{4}	^{5}_{3}	^{5}_{2}	^{5}_{1}	^{5}_{0}	^{4}_{9}	^{4}_{8}	^{4}_{7}	^{4}_{6}	^{4}_{5}	^{4}_{4}	^{4}_{3}	^{4}_{2}	^{4}_{1}	^{4}_{0}	^{3}_{9}	^{3}_{8}	^{3}_{7}	^{3}_{6}	^{3}_{5}	^{3}_{4}	^{3}_{3}	^{3}_{2}
Unused																P	DPL		S	X	C	R	A	Base[16..23]

- 80386 Segment descriptor
^{3}_{1}	^{3}_{0}	^{2}_{9}	^{2}_{8}	^{2}_{7}	^{2}_{6}	^{2}_{5}	^{2}_{4}	^{2}_{3}	^{2}_{2}	^{2}_{1}	^{2}_{0}	^{1}_{9}	^{1}_{8}	^{1}_{7}	^{1}_{6}	^{1}_{5}	^{1}_{4}	^{1}_{3}	^{1}_{2}	^{1}_{1}	^{1}_{0}	^{0}_{9}	^{0}_{8}	^{0}_{7}	^{0}_{6}	^{0}_{5}	^{0}_{4}	^{0}_{3}	^{0}_{2}	^{0}_{1}	^{0}_{0}
Base[0..15]																Limit[0..15]
^{6}_{3}	^{6}_{2}	^{6}_{1}	^{6}_{0}	^{5}_{9}	^{5}_{8}	^{5}_{7}	^{5}_{6}	^{5}_{5}	^{5}_{4}	^{5}_{3}	^{5}_{2}	^{5}_{1}	^{5}_{0}	^{4}_{9}	^{4}_{8}	^{4}_{7}	^{4}_{6}	^{4}_{5}	^{4}_{4}	^{4}_{3}	^{4}_{2}	^{4}_{1}	^{4}_{0}	^{3}_{9}	^{3}_{8}	^{3}_{7}	^{3}_{6}	^{3}_{5}	^{3}_{4}	^{3}_{3}	^{3}_{2}
Base[24..31]								G	D	0	U	Limit[16..19]				P	DPL		S	X	C	R	A	Base[16..23]

Where:

- A is the Accessed bit;
- R is the Readable bit;
- C (Bit 42) depends on X:
  - if X = 1 then C is the Conforming bit, and determines which privilege levels can far-jump to this segment (without changing privilege level):
    - if C = 0 then only code with the same privilege level as DPL may jump here;
    - if C = 1 then code with the same or a lower privilege level relative to DPL may jump here.
  - if X = 0 then C is the direction bit:
    - if C = 0 then the segment grows up;
    - if C = 1 then the segment grows down.
- X is the Executable bit:
  - if X = 1 then the segment is a code segment;
  - if X = 0 then the segment is a data segment.
- S is the Segment type bit, which should generally be cleared for system segments;
- DPL is the Descriptor Privilege Level;
- P is the Present bit;
- D is the Default operand size;
- G is the Granularity bit;
- Bit 52 of the 80386 descriptor is not used by the hardware.

=== Paging ===
Common method of using paging to create a virtual address space

Paging (on Intel 80386) with page size of 4K

In addition to adding virtual 8086 mode, the 386 also added paging to protected mode. Through paging, system software can restrict and control a task's access to pages, which are sections of memory. In many operating systems, paging is used to create an independent virtual address space for each task, preventing one task from manipulating the memory of another. Paging also allows for pages to be moved out of primary storage and onto a slower and larger secondary storage, such as a hard disk drive. This allows for more memory to be used than physically available in primary storage.

The x86 architecture allows control of pages through two arrays: page directories and page tables. Originally, a page directory was the size of one page, four kilobytes, and contained 1,024 page directory entries (PDE), although subsequent enhancements to the x86 architecture have added the ability to use larger page sizes. Each PDE contained a pointer to a page table. A page table was also originally four kilobytes in size and contained 1,024 page table entries (PTE). Each PTE contained a pointer to the actual page's physical address and are only used when the four-kilobyte pages are used. At any given time, only one page directory may be in active use.

=== Multitasking ===
Through the use of the rings, privileged call gates, and the Task State Segment (TSS), introduced with the 286, preemptive multitasking was made possible on the x86 architecture. The TSS allows general-purpose registers, segment selector fields, and stacks to all be modified without affecting those of another task. The TSS also allows a task's privilege level, and I/O port permissions to be independent of another task's.

In many operating systems, the full features of the TSS are not used. This is commonly due to portability concerns or due to the performance issues created with hardware task switches. As a result, many operating systems use both hardware and software to create a multitasking system.

== Operating systems ==
Operating systems like OS/2 1.x try to switch the processor between protected and real modes. This is both slow and unsafe, because a real mode program can easily crash a computer. OS/2 1.x defines restrictive programming rules allowing a Family API or bound program to run in either real or protected mode. Some early Unix operating systems, OS/2 1.x, and Windows used this mode.

Windows 3.0 was able to run real mode programs in 16-bit protected mode; when switching to protected mode, it decided to preserve the single privilege level model that was used in real mode, which is why Windows applications and DLLs can hook interrupts and do direct hardware access. That lasted through the Windows 9x series. If a Windows 1.x or 2.x program is written properly and avoids segment arithmetic, it will run the same way in both real and protected modes. Windows programs generally avoid segment arithmetic because Windows implements a software virtual memory scheme, moving program code and data in memory when programs are not running, so manipulating absolute addresses is dangerous; programs should only keep handles to memory blocks when not running. Starting an old program while Windows 3.0 is running in protected mode triggers a warning dialog, suggesting to either run Windows in real mode or to obtain an updated version of the application. Updating well-behaved programs using the MARK utility with the MEMORY parameter avoids this dialog. It is not possible to have some GUI programs running in 16-bit protected mode and other GUI programs running in real mode. In Windows 3.1, real mode was no longer supported and could not be accessed.

In modern 32-bit operating systems, virtual 8086 mode is still used for running applications, e.g. DPMI compatible DOS extender programs (through virtual DOS machines) or Windows 3.x applications (through the Windows on Windows subsystem) and certain classes of device drivers (e.g. for changing the screen-resolution using BIOS functionality) in OS/2 2.0 (and later OS/2) and 32-bit Windows NT, all under control of a 32-bit kernel. However, 64-bit operating systems (which run in long mode) no longer use this, since virtual 8086 mode has been removed from long mode.

== See also ==
- Long mode
- Assembly language
- Intel
- Ring (computer security)
- x86 assembly language
