= Memory manager =

Memory manager may refer to:

- Memory management, a form of resource management applied to computer memory
- Memory management unit, primarily performing the translation of virtual memory addresses to physical addresses
- DOS memory management
  - Expanded memory manager (EMM)
  - Extended memory manager (XMM)
    - HIMEM.SYS
  - 80386 memory manager, may manage both expanded and extended memory
    - 386MAX
    - CEMM
    - EMM386
    - QEMM
