= Keyboard interrupt =

In computing, keyboard interrupt may refer to:

- A special case of signal (computing), a condition (often implemented as an exception) usually generated by the keyboard in the text user interface
- A hardware interrupt generated when a key is pressed or released, see keyboard controller (computing)
