= Keyboard controller =

Keyboard controller may refer to:

- Keyboard controller (computing), a computer hardware which connects a keyboard to the main board
- In music, a MIDI keyboard with some additional controls
