= Keyboard controller (computing) =

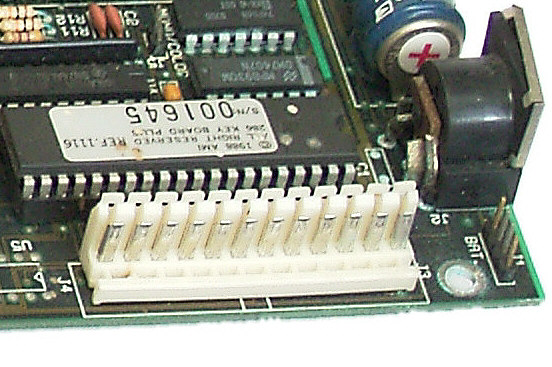
Keyboard controller and AT-Keyboard jack on an AT-Mainboard

In computing, a keyboard controller is a device that interfaces a keyboard to a computer. Its main function is to inform the computer when a key is pressed or released. When data from the keyboard arrives, the controller raises an interrupt (a keyboard interrupt) to allow the CPU to handle the input.

If a keyboard is a separate peripheral system unit (such as in most modern desktop computers), the keyboard controller is not directly attached to the keys, but receives scancodes from a microcontroller embedded in the keyboard via some kind of serial interface. In this case, the controller usually also controls the keyboard's LEDs by sending data back to keyboard through the wire.

The IBM PC AT used an Intel 8042 chip to interface to the keyboard. This chip had two additional functions: it controlled access to the Intel 80286 CPU's A20 line in order to implement a workaround for a chip bug, and it was used to initiate a software CPU reset in order to allow the CPU to transition from protected mode to real mode because the 286 did not allow the CPU to go from protected mode to real mode unless the CPU is reset. The latter was a problem because the BIOS and services provided by real mode operating systems such as MS-DOS and similar operating systems could only be called by programs in real mode. These behaviors have been used by plenty of software that expects this behavior, and therefore keyboard controllers have continued controlling the A20 line and performing software CPU resets even when the need for a reset via the keyboard controller was obviated by the Intel 80386's ability to switch to real mode from protected mode without a CPU reset. The keyboard controller also handles PS/2 mouse input if a PS/2 mouse port is present.

== Modern interface ==
Today the keyboard controller is either a unit inside a Super I/O device or is missing, having its keyboard and mouse functions handled by a USB controller and its role in controlling the A20 line becoming integrated into the chipset's northbridge and then later into the CPU's built-in integrated memory controller.

== See also ==
- Keyboard buffer
- AT keyboard
- KVM extender
- Embedded controller: The Intel 8042 and other keyboard controllers used in computers based on the IBM PC/AT design can be considered embedded controllers.
