= Intel MCS-48 =

Family of 8-bit microcontrollers

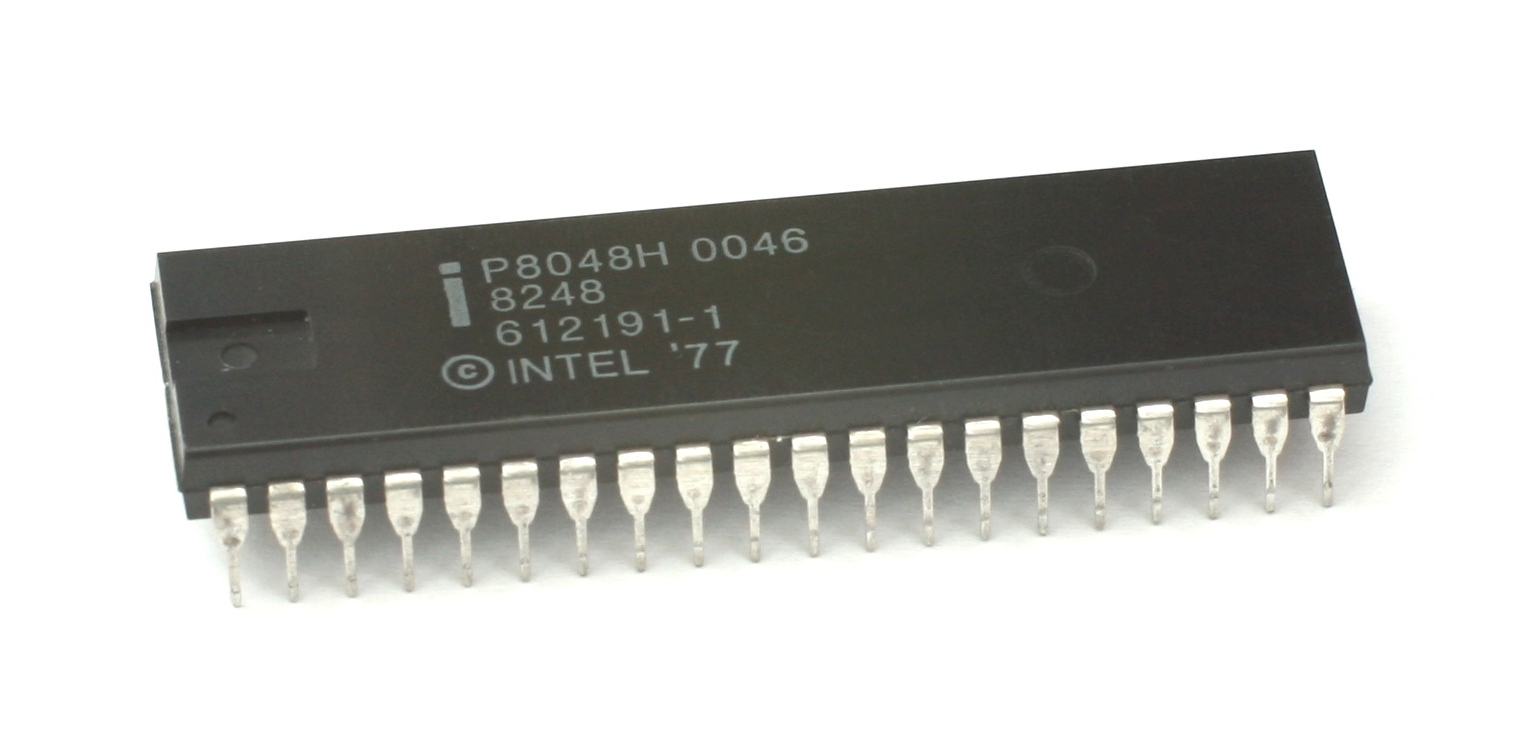
Intel 8048 microcontroller

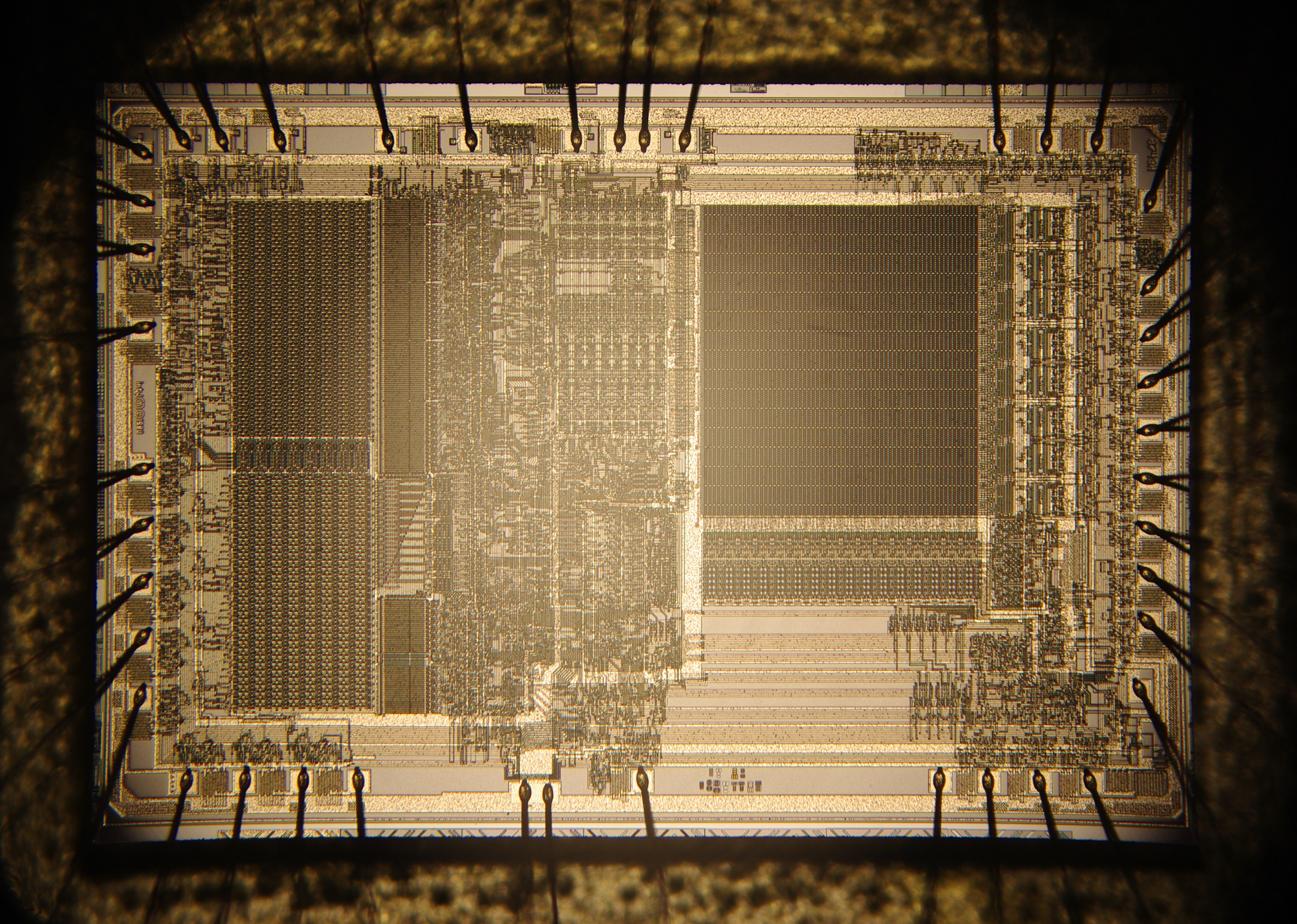
Intel 8749 die

The MCS-48 microcontroller series, Intel's first microcontroller, was originally released in 1976. Its first members were 8048, 8035 and 8748. The 8048 is arguably the most prominent member of the family.

Initially, this family was produced using NMOS (n-type metal–oxide–semiconductor) technology. In the early 1980s, it became available in CMOS technology. It was manufactured into the 1990s to support older designs that still used it.

The MCS-48 series has a modified Harvard architecture, with internal or external program ROM and 64 to 256 bytes of internal (on-chip) RAM. The I/O is mapped into its own address space, separate from programs and data.

Though the MCS-48 series was eventually replaced by the very successful MCS-51 series, it remained quite popular even by the year 2000 due to its low cost, wide availability, memory-efficient one-byte instruction set, and mature development tools. Because of this, the architecture is still used in high-volume, cost-sensitive consumer electronics devices such as TV remotes, computer keyboards, and toys.

== Uses ==
Intel 8048 registers
^{1}_{1}	^{1}_{0}	^{0}_{9}	^{0}_{8}	^{0}_{7}	^{0}_{6}	^{0}_{5}	^{0}_{4}	^{0}_{3}	^{0}_{2}	^{0}_{1}	^{0}_{0}	(bit position)
Main registers
				A								Accumulator
	PC											Program Counter
Timer/Counter
				T								Timer
Program Status Word
				CY	AC	F0	BS	1	Stack
Flags
								DBF		F1	I
Note: All other programmer-visible registers and stack are allocated in RAM.

The MCS-48 series was commonly used in computer and terminal keyboards, converting key presses into protocols that can be understood by digital circuits. This also allows the possibility of serial communication, reducing the number of conductors needed in cables on external keyboards. The 8048 has been used in this application since its introduction in 1978.

The Tandy/Radio Shack TRS-80 Model II, released in 1979, used the 8021 in its keyboard. The 8021 processor scans the key matrix, converts switch closures to an 8-bit code and then transmits that code serially to the keyboard interface on the main system. It will also accept commands to turn indicator LEDs on or off. The 8021 was also used in the keyboards for the TRS-80 Model 12, 12B, 16, 16B and the Tandy 6000/6000HD.

The original IBM PC keyboard and the keyboard for its precursor the IBM System/23 Datamaster used an 8048 as its internal microcontroller. The PC AT replaced the PC's Intel 8255 peripheral interface chip at I/O port addresses 0x60–63 with an 8042 accessible through port addresses 0x60 and 0x64. As well as managing the keyboard interface, the 8042 controlled the A20 line gating function for the AT's Intel 80286 CPU and could be commanded by software to reset the 80286 (unlike the 80386 and later processors, the 80286 had no way of switching from protected mode back to real mode except by being reset). Later PC compatibles integrate the 8042's functions into their super I/O devices.

The 8048 was used in the Magnavox Odyssey² video game console, the Korg Trident series, and the Korg Poly-61, Roland Jupiter-4 and Roland ProMars analog synthesizers. The Sinclair QL used the closely related Intel 8049 to manage its keyboard, joystick ports, RS-232 inputs and audio. The ROM-less 8035 variant was used in Nintendo's arcade game Donkey Kong to generate the background music and some of the game's sound effects.

== Instruction set ==
All MCS-48 instructions are one or two bytes long, with 70% of the instructions being one byte. The MCS-48 can address 4096 bytes of program memory, 256 bytes of RAM, 256 bytes of external memory, and eight port I/O addresses. Most arithmetic and logical operations use the accumulator as a parameter and destination. Eight memory locations are mapped as registers so they can be addressed by a 3-bit field embedded in many instructions. Two of those registers can be used as memory pointers. Conditional branches can only access the current 256-byte page. JMP and CALL can directly access 2048 locations. To access the entire 4096-byte program space, a clunky select memory bank instruction must be used. The RET instruction can, however, return anywhere in the address space. Interrupts are well supported with alternate registers for quick context switches and the ability to restore the state of the flags with the RETR instruction. All instructions execute in one or two machine cycles. Each machine cycle takes 15 external clocks.

Opcode								Operand	Mnemonic	Cycles	Description
7	6	5	4	3	2	1	0	Operand	Mnemonic	Cycles	Description
0	0	0	0	0	0	0	0	—	NOP	1	No operation
0	0	0	0	0	0	1	0	—	OUTL BUS,A	2	Bus latch ← A
ALUI				0	0	1	1	data	ADD ADDC MOV ORL ANL XRL	2	A ← A ALU #
addhi			0	0	1	0	0	addlo	JMP add	2	PC ← DBF:addhi:addlo
0	0	0	I	0	1	0	1	—	EN/DIS I	1	I ← 0 (EN) or I ← 1 (DIS)
0	0	0	0	0	1	1	1	—	DEC A	1	A ← A - 1
0	0	0	0	1	0	0	0	—	INS A,BUS	2	A ← bus
0	0	0	0	1	0	PP		—	IN A,Pp	2	A ← Port(p) (Ports 1-2)
0	0	0	0	1	PP			—	MOVD A,Pp	2	A_{0-3} ← 8243 Port(p); A_{4-7} ← 0 (Ports 4-7)
ALU				0	0	0	R	—	INC XCH ORL ANL ADD ADDC; MOVaA XRL MOVAa	1	dest ← dest ALU @Rr (@R0, @R1 only; no DEC)
ALU				1	RRR			—	INC XCH ORL ANL ADD ADDC; MOVaA DEC XRL MOVAa	1	dest ← dest ALU Rr
BIT			1	0	0	1	0	addr	JBb addr	2	If A ∧ (1 << b) then PC_{0-7} ← addr
addhi			1	0	1	0	0	addlo	CALL add	2	(SP) ← PSW_{4-7}:PC; SP ← SP + 1; PC ← DBF:addhi:addlo
0	0	0	1	0	1	1	0	addr	JTF addr	2	If TF = 1 then PC_{0-7} ← addr (timer flag set)
0	0	0	1	0	1	1	1	—	INC A	1	A ← A + 1
0	0	1	T	0	1	0	1	—	EN/DIS TCNTI	1	TCNTI ← 0 (EN) or TCNTI ← 1 (DIS) (timer/counter interrupt)
0	0	1	F	0	1	1	0	addr	JNT0 JT0 addr	2	If F = T0 then PC_{0-7} ← addr (test input 0)
0	0	1	0	0	1	1	1	—	CLR A	1	A ← 0
0	0	1	1	0	1	1	1	—	CPL A	1	A ← ¬A
0	0	1	1	1	0	PP		—	OUTL Pp,A	2	Port(p) ← A (Ports 1-2)
0	0	1	1	1	PP			—	MOVD Pp,A	2	8243 Port(p) ← A_{0-3} (Ports 4-7)
0	1	0	0	0	0	1	0	—	MOV A,T	1	A ← T (Move timer to A)
0	1	0	T	0	1	0	1	—	STRT CNT/T	1	If T = 0 start count else start timer
0	1	0	F	0	1	1	0	addr	JNT1 JT1 addr	2	If F = T1 then PC_{0-7} ← addr (test input 1)
0	1	0	0	0	1	1	1	—	SWAP A	1	A_{0-3} ↔ A_{4-7}
0	1	0	1	0	1	1	1	—	DA A	1	If A_{0-4} > 9 OR AC = 1 then A ← A + 6; then if A_{4-7} > 9 OR C = 1 then A ← A + 0x60
0	1	1	0	0	0	1	0	—	MOV T,A	1	T ← A (Move A to timer)
0	1	1	0	0	1	0	1	—	STOP TCNT	1	Stop timer and count
0	1	1	0	0	1	1	1	—	RRC A	1	C ← A_{0}; A_{0-6} ← A_{1-7}; A_{7} ← C
0	1	1	1	0	1	0	1	—	ENT0 CLK	1	Set T0 as a clock output
0	1	1	1	0	1	1	0	addr	JF1 addr	2	If F1 = 1 then PC_{0-7} ← addr
0	1	1	1	0	1	1	1	—	RR A	1	A_{0-6} ← A_{1-7}; A_{7} ← A_{0}
1	0	0	0	0	0	0	R	—	MOVX A,@Rr	2	A ← external @Rr (@R0, @R1 only)
1	0	0	0	0	0	1	1	—	RET	2	SP ← SP - 1; PC ← (SP)
1	0	N	0	0	1	0	1	—	CLR Fn	1	Fn ← 0
1	0	0	0	0	1	1	0	addr	JNI addr	2	If I input = 0 then PC_{0-7} ← addr (test interrupt input low)
1	0	0	0	1	0	0	0	data	ORL BUS,#	2	A ← bus ∨ #
1	0	0	0	1	0	PP		data	ORL Pp,#	2	A ← Port(p) ∨ # (Ports 1-2)
1	0	0	0	1	PP			—	ORLD Pp,A	2	8243 Port(p) ← 8243 Port(p) ∨ A_{0-3} (Ports 4-7)
1	0	0	1	0	0	0	R	—	MOVX @Rr,A	2	external @Rr ← A (@R0, @R1 only)
1	0	0	1	0	0	1	1	—	RETR	2	SP ← SP - 1; PC ← (SP); PSW_{4-7} ← (SP)
1	0	N	1	0	1	0	1	—	CPL Fn	1	Fn ← ¬Fn
1	0	0	1	0	1	1	1	—	CLR C	1	C ← 0
1	0	0	1	1	0	0	0	data	ANL BUS,#	2	A ← bus ∧ #
1	0	0	1	1	0	PP		data	ANL Pp,#	2	A ← Port(p) ∧ # (Ports 1-2)
1	0	0	1	1	PP			—	ANLD Pp,A	2	8243 Port(p) ← 8243 Port(p) ∧ A_{0-3} (Ports 4-7)
1	0	1	0	0	0	1	1	—	MOVP A,@A	2	A ← ROM(PC_{8-11}:A) (read program memory)
1	0	1	0	0	1	1	1	—	CPL C	1	C ← ¬C
1	0	1	1	0	0	1	1	—	JMPP @A	2	PC_{0-7} ← A (indirect JMP)
1	0	1	1	0	1	1	0	addr	JF0 addr	2	If F0 = 1 then PC_{0-7} ← addr
1	1	0	N	0	1	0	1	—	SEL RBn	1	BS ← n (select register bank)
1	1	0	0	0	1	1	0	addr	JZ addr	2	If A = 0 then PC_{0-7} ← addr
1	1	0	0	0	1	1	1	—	MOV A,PSW	1	A ← PSW
1	1	0	1	0	1	1	1	—	MOV PSW,A	1	PSW ← A
1	1	1	0	0	0	1	1	—	MOVP3 A,@A	2	A ← ROM(0011:A) (read page 3 program memory)
1	1	1	N	0	1	0	1	—	SEL MBn	1	DBF ← n (select memory bank: PC_{11})
1	1	1	F	0	1	1	0	addr	JNC JC addr	2	If F = C then PC_{0-7} ← addr
1	1	1	0	0	1	1	1	—	RL A	1	A_{1-7} ← A_{0-6}; A_{0} ← A_{7}
1	1	1	0	1	RRR			addr	DJNZ Rr,addr	2	Rr ← Rr - 1; If Rr ≠ 0 then PC_{0-7} ← addr
1	1	1	1	0	1	1	1	—	RLC A	1	C ← A_{7}; A_{1-7} ← A_{0-6}; A_{0} ← C
7	6	5	4	3	2	1	0	Operand	Mnemonic	Cycles	Description
RRR or R				3	2	1	0	ALU		ALUI #immed	
R0 @R0				0	0	0	0			ADD A,# (A ← A + #)	
R1 @R1				0	0	0	1	INC arg (arg ← arg + 1)		ADDC A,# (A ← A + # + C)	
R2				0	0	1	0	XCH A,arg (A ↔ arg)		MOV R,# (R ← #)	
R3				0	0	1	1				
R4				0	1	0	0	ORL A,arg (A ← A ∨ arg)		ORL A,# (A ← A ∨ #)	
R5				0	1	0	1	ANL A,arg (A ← A ∧ arg)		ANL A,# (A ← A ∧ #)	
R6				0	1	1	0	ADD A,arg (A ← A + arg)			
R7				0	1	1	1	ADDC A,arg (A ← A + arg + C)			
				1	0	1	0	MOV arg,A (arg ← A)			
				1	1	0	0	DEC arg (arg ← arg - 1)			
				1	1	0	1	XRL A,arg (A ← A ⊻ arg)		XRL A,# (A ← A ⊻ #)	
				1	1	1	1	MOV A,arg (A ← arg)			
RRR or R				3	2	1	0	ALU		ALUI #immed	

=== Example code ===
The following assembler source code is for a subroutine named add32 that adds two 32-bit integers stored in little endian order. One addend is pointed to by R0 and the other addend and result are pointed to by R1.

 
 
 
 
 
 
 
 
 
100
100  BA 04
102  97
103  F0
104  71
105  A1
106  18
107  19
108  EA 03
10A  83
10B

; Add32 --
; Add two 32-bit integers
;
; Entry registers
;       R0 - Address of first addend
;       R1 - Address of second addend and result
; Altered registers
;       R0, R1, R2.

            ORG      100h        ;Origin at 100h
ADD32:      MOV      R2,#32./8.  ;number of bytes in 32 bits
            CLR      C           ;prepare C for ADDC
ADDLP:      MOV      A,@R0       ;Get first addend
            ADDC     A,@R1       ;Add second addend + CY
            MOV      @R1,A       ;Store result
            INC      R0          ;Bump memory pointers
            INC      R1
            DJNZ     R2,ADDLP    ;Loop R2 times
            RET
            END

== Variants ==
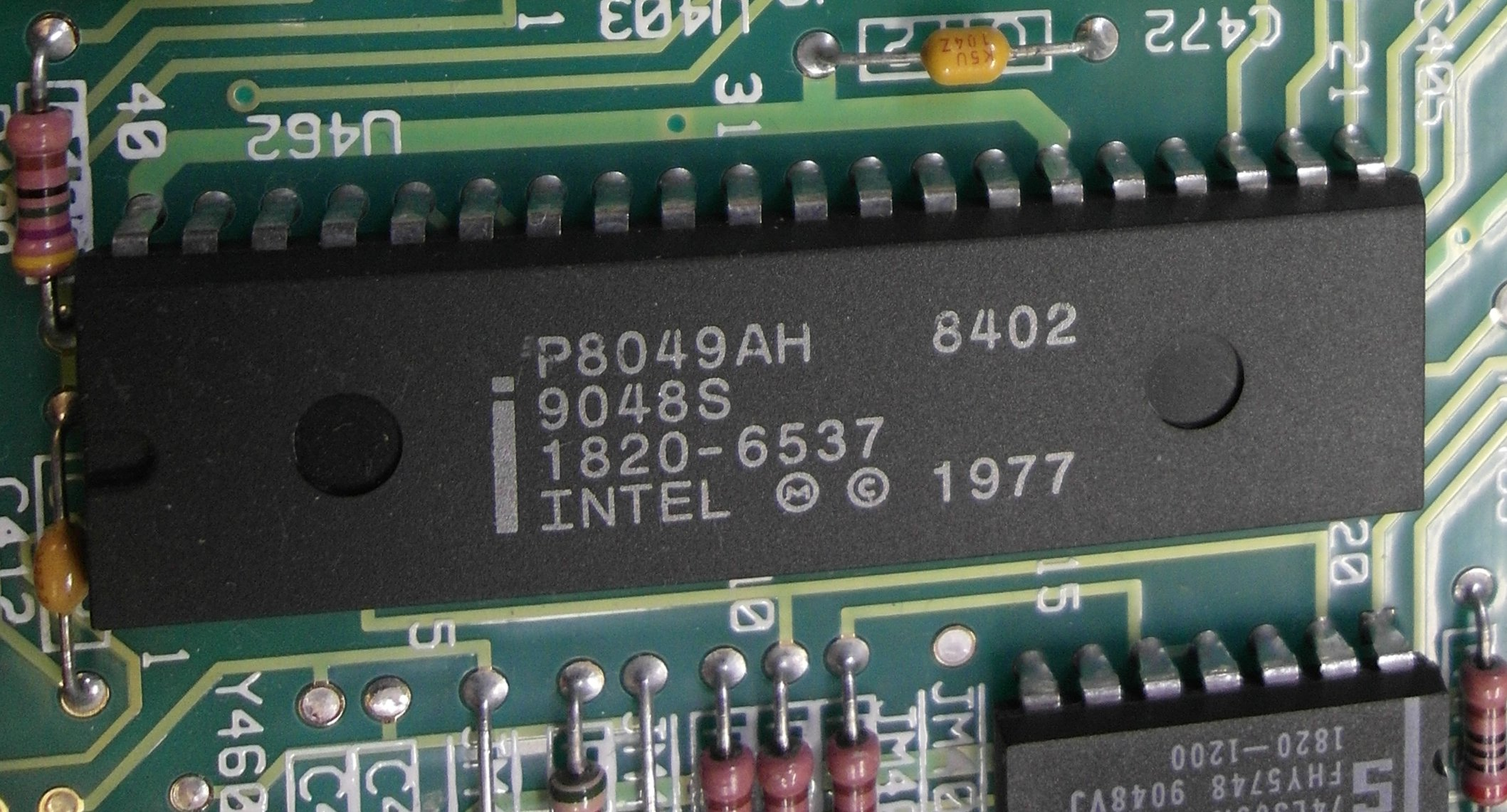
An Intel 8049 microcontroller, as used in a HP3478A multimeter. This chip was manufactured in the second week of 1984.

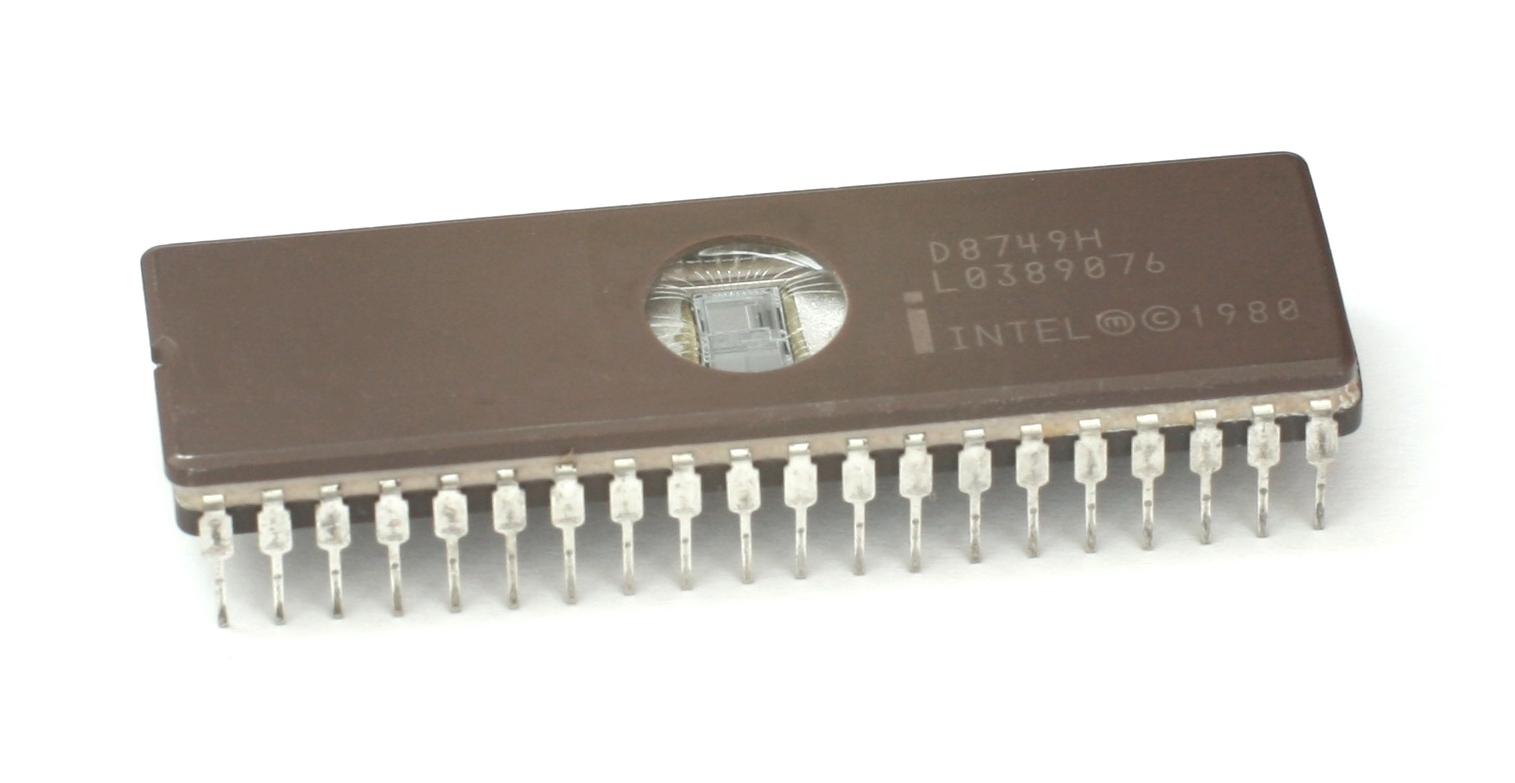
The 8749 with UV EPROM

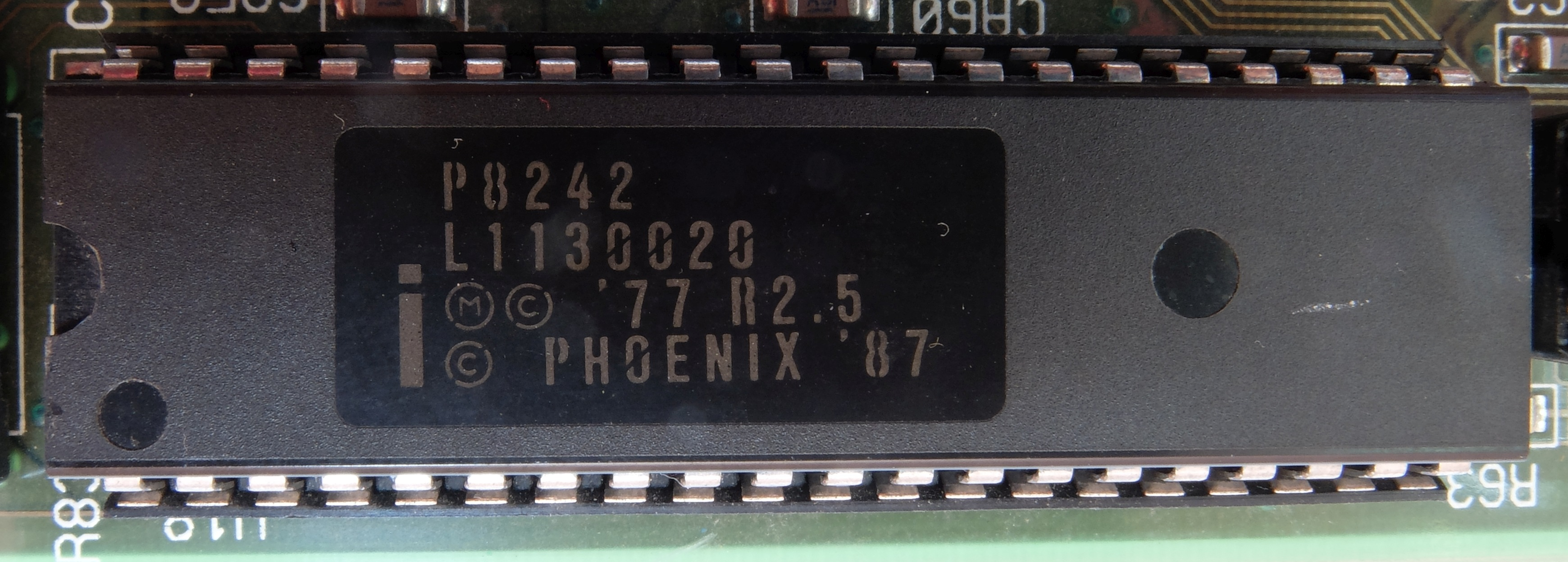
Intel P8242 - keyboard controller with Phoenix firmware for AT-compatible computers

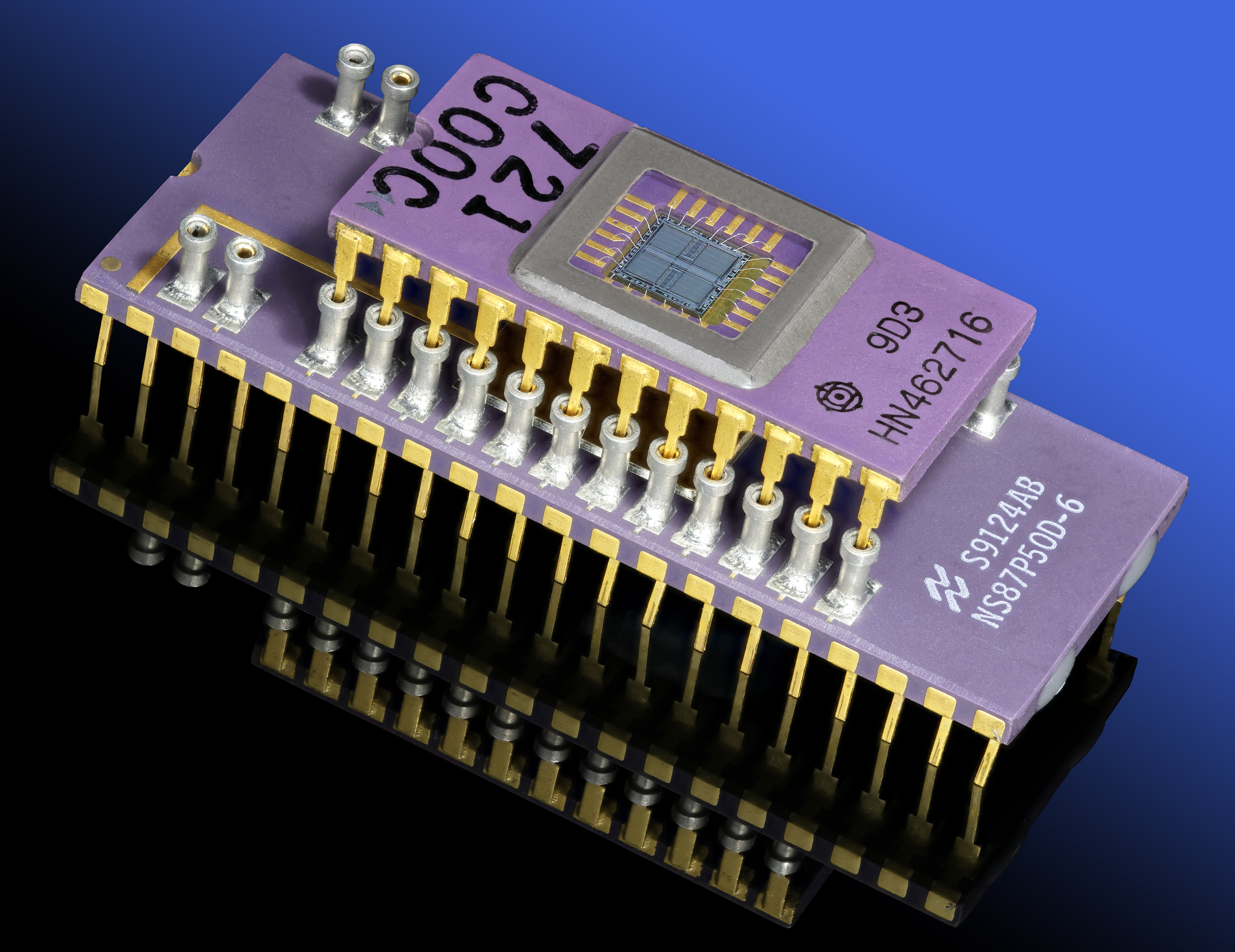
National Semiconductor NS87P50D-6 – Second source for the 87P50 piggyback microcontroller

The 8049 has 2 KB of masked ROM (the 8748 and 8749 had EPROM) that can be replaced with a 4 KB external ROM, as well as 128 bytes of RAM and 27 I/O ports. The microcontroller's oscillator block divides the clock input frequency by three and then further divides the result into five machine states. Using the 11 MHz maximum crystal frequency will produce 0.73 MIPS of single-cycle instructions. Some 70% of instructions are single-byte and single-cycle ones, but 30% need two cycles or two bytes, so its typical performance would be closer to 0.5 MIPS.

Microcontroller
Device	Program memory	Data memory	Remarks
8020	1K × 8 ROM	64 × 8 RAM	subset of 8048, 20 pins, only 13 I/O lines
8021	1K × 8 ROM	64 × 8 RAM	subset of 8048, 28 pins, 21 I/O lines
8022	2K × 8 ROM	64 × 8 RAM	subset of 8048, A/D-converter
8035	none	64 × 8 RAM	
8038	none	64 × 8 RAM	
8039	none	128 × 8 RAM	
8040	none	256 × 8 RAM	
8048	1K × 8 ROM	64 × 8 RAM	27× I/O ports
8049	2K × 8 ROM	128 × 8 RAM	27× I/O ports
8050	4K x 8 ROM	256 × 8 RAM	
8648	1K × 8 OTP EPROM	64 × 8 RAM	Factory OTP EPROM
8748	1K × 8 EPROM	64 × 8 RAM	4K program memory expandable, 2× 8-bit timers, 27× I/O ports
8749	2K × 8 EPROM	128 × 8 RAM	2× 8-bit timers, 27× I/O ports
87P50	ext. ROM socket	256 × 8 RAM	Has piggy-back socket for 2758/2716/2732 EPROM

The UPI-41 series is a variation of the MCS-48 intended for peripheral devices, meant to respond on-demand on a parallel bus. Due to this, a buffered parallel data-bus interface was built into these chips, and some op-code instructions were changed to enable operation of this interface.

Universal Peripheral Interface
Device	Program memory	Data memory	Remarks
8041	1K × 8 ROM	64 × 8 RAM	Universal Peripheral Interface (UPI)
8041AH	1K × 8 ROM	128 × 8 RAM	UPI
8741A	1K × 8 EPROM	64 × 8 RAM	UPI, EPROM version of 8041
8741AH	1K × 8 OTP EPROM	128 × 8 RAM	UPI, OTP EPROM version of 8041AH
8042AH	2K × 8 ROM	256 × 8 RAM	UPI
8242	2K × 8 ROM	256 × 8 RAM	UPI, preprogrammed with keyboard controller firmware
8742	2K × 8 EPROM	128 × 8 RAM	UPI, EPROM version
8742AH	2K × 8 OTP EPROM	256 × 8 RAM	UPI, OTP EPROM version of 8042AH

== Derived microcontrollers ==
Philips Semiconductors (now NXP) owned a license to produce this series and developed their MAB8400-family based on this architecture. These were the first microcontrollers with an integrated I²C-interface and were used in the first Philips (Magnavox in the US) Compact Disc players (e.g. the CD-100).

Intel MCS-48 second sources

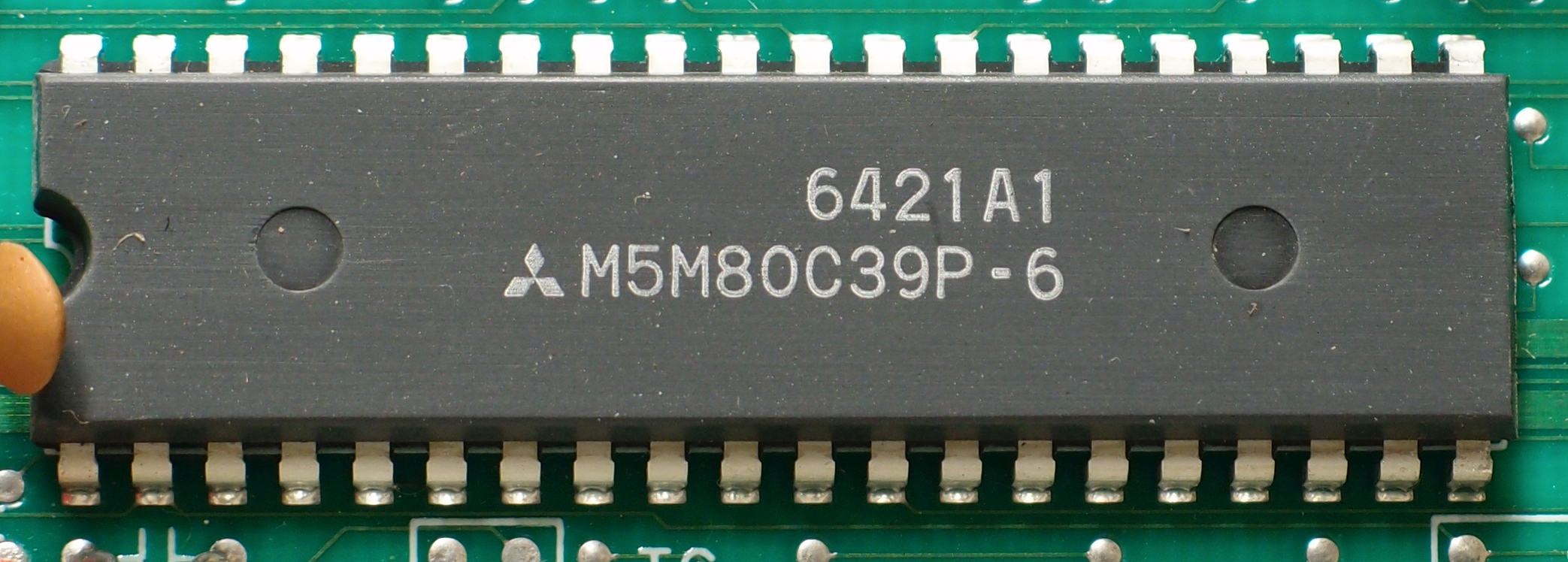
Mitsubishi Electric M5M80C39P-6

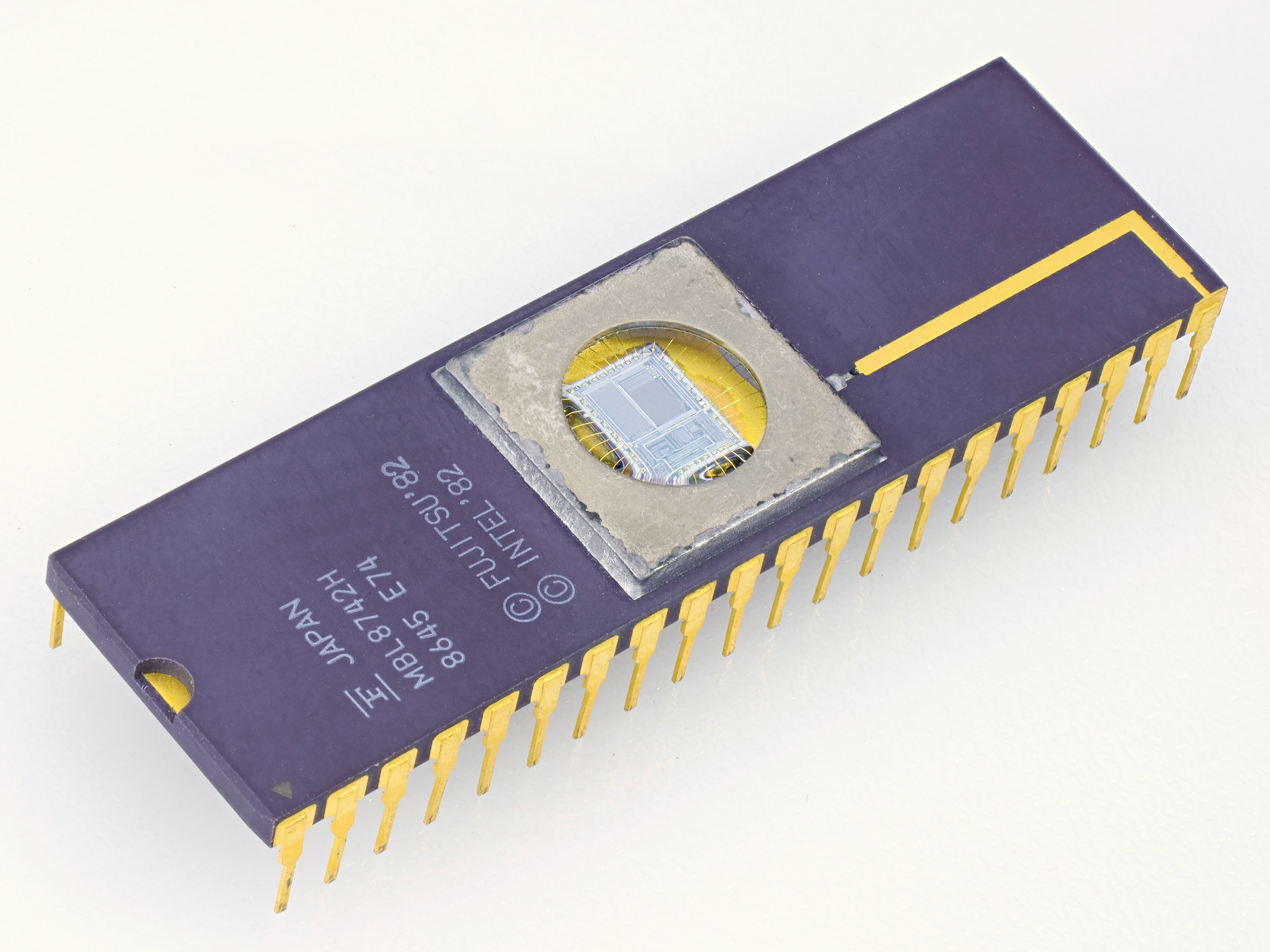
Fujitsu MBL8742H

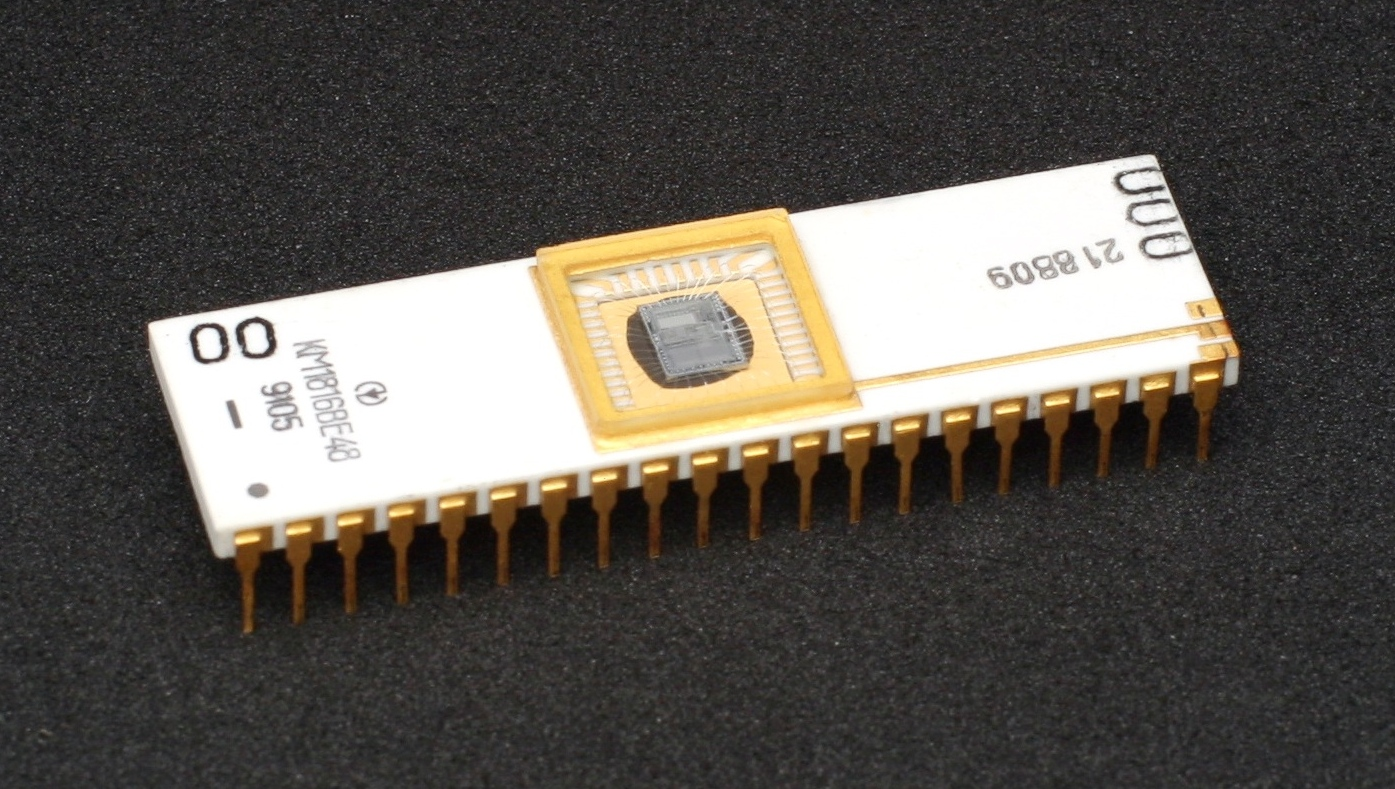
Kvazar Kiev KM1816VE48 (Soviet Union – 8748 clone)

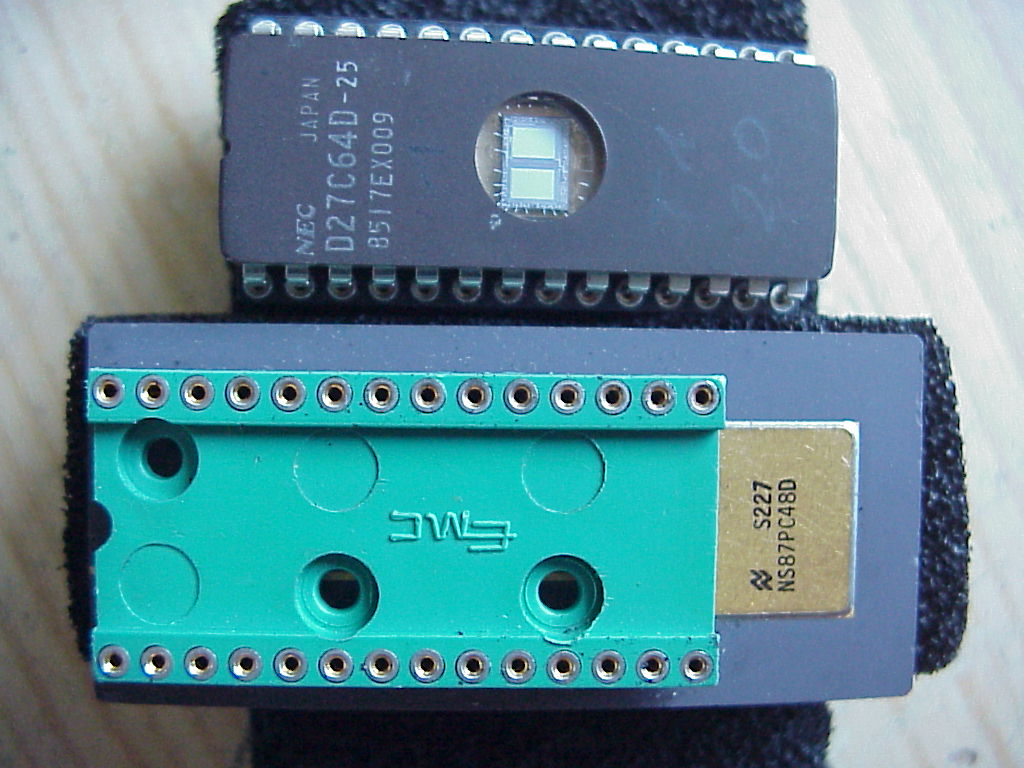
National Semiconductor NS87PC48D (piggyback variant)

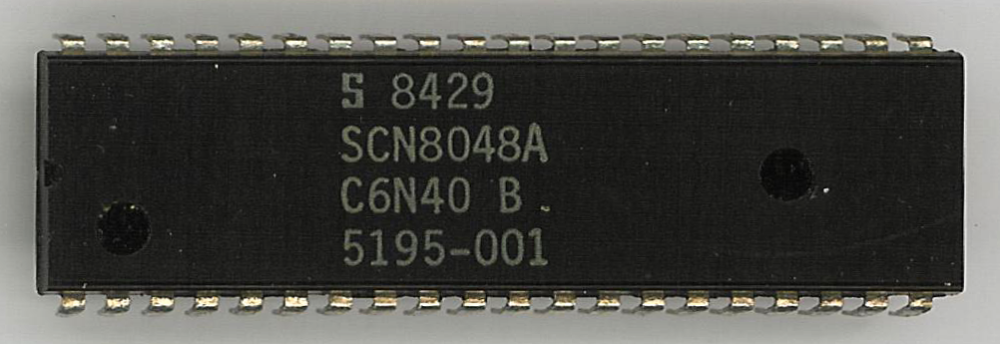
Signetics SCN8048A

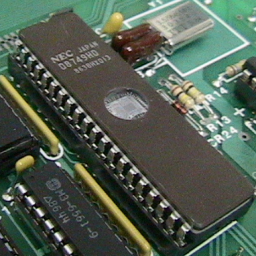
NEC μPD8749HD

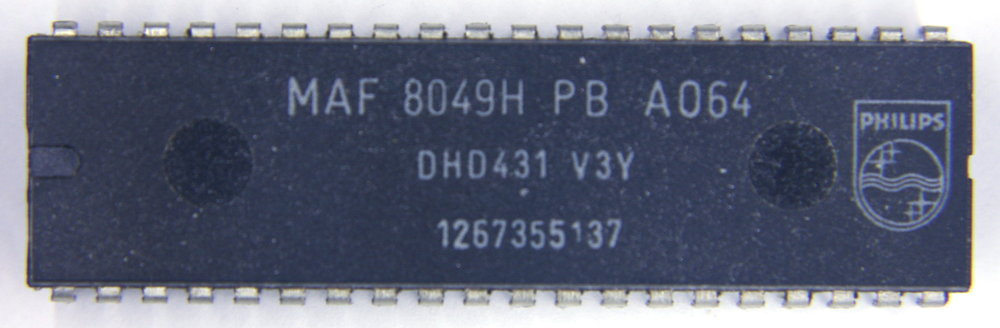
Philips MAF 8049H

== See also ==
- HSE-49 emulator

== Bibliography ==
MCS-48

- MCS-48 Single Component Microcomputer (Applications Seminar Notebook). Intel Corporation. 1978.
- MCS-48 Microcomputer User's Manual (PDF). Intel Corporation. 1978.
- Smith, Lionel; Moore, Cecil (January 1979). "Serial I/O and Math Utilities for the 8049 Microcomputer". Intel Corporation. Application Note AP-49.
- A High-Speed Emulator for Intel MCS-48 Microcomputers. Intel Corporation. August 1979. Application Note AP-55A.
- Dahm, Phil; Rosenberg, Stuart (December 1979). Intel MCS-48 and UPI-41A Microcontrollers. Intel Corporation. Reliability Report RR-25.
- Microcontroller Handbook (PDF). Intel. 1984. Order number 210918-002.
- 8-Bit Embedded Controllers (PDF). Intel. 1991. Order number 270645-003.

UPI-41

- Intel (1980). UPI-41A User's Manual (PDF). Order number 9800504-02 Rev. B.
- Microprocessor Peripherals UPI-41A/41AH/42/42AH User's Manual (PDF). Intel Corporation. October 1993. 231318-006.
- Beaston, Johan; Kahn, Jim (May 1980). An 8741A/8041A Digital Cassette Controller. Intel Corporation. Application Note AP-90.
