= Memory-mapped I/O and port-mapped I/O =

Method of CPU communication

Memory-mapped I/O (MMIO) and port-mapped I/O (PMIO) are two complementary methods of performing input/output (I/O) between the central processing unit (CPU) and peripheral devices in a computer (often mediating access via chipset). An alternative approach is using dedicated I/O processors, commonly known as channels on mainframe computers, which execute their own instructions.

Memory-mapped I/O uses the same address space to address both main memory (Note: A memory that besides registers is directly accessible by the processor, e.g. DRAM in IBM PC compatible computers or Flash/SRAM in microcontrollers.) and I/O devices. The memory and registers of the I/O devices are mapped to (associated with) address values, so a memory address may refer to either a portion of physical RAM or to memory and registers of the I/O device. Thus, the CPU instructions used to access the memory (e.g. MOV ...) can also be used for accessing devices. Each I/O device either monitors the CPU's address bus and responds to any CPU access of an address assigned to that device, connecting the system bus to the desired device's hardware register, or uses a dedicated bus.

To accommodate the I/O devices, some areas of the address bus used by the CPU must be reserved for I/O and must not be available for normal physical memory; the range of addresses used for I/O devices is determined by the hardware. The reservation may be permanent, or temporary (as achieved via bank switching). An example of the latter is found in the Commodore 64, which uses a form of memory mapping to cause RAM or I/O hardware to appear in the 0xD000–0xDFFF range.

Port-mapped I/O often uses a special class of CPU instructions designed specifically for performing I/O, such as the in and out instructions found on microprocessors based on the x86 architecture. Different forms of these two instructions can copy one, two or four bytes (outb, outw and outd, respectively) between the EAX register or one of that register's subdivisions on the CPU and a specified I/O port address which is assigned to an I/O device. I/O devices have a separate address space from general memory, either accomplished by an extra "I/O" pin on the CPU's physical interface, or an entire bus dedicated to I/O. Because the address space for I/O is isolated from that for main memory, this is sometimes referred to as isolated I/O. On the x86 architecture, index/data pair is often used for port-mapped I/O.

== Overview ==
Different CPU-to-device communication methods, such as memory mapping, do not affect the direct memory access (DMA) for a device, because, by definition, DMA is a memory-to-device communication method that bypasses the CPU.

Hardware interrupts are another communication method between the CPU and peripheral devices, however, for a number of reasons, interrupts are always treated separately. An interrupt is device-initiated, as opposed to the methods mentioned above, which are CPU-initiated. It is also unidirectional, as information flows only from device to CPU. Lastly, each interrupt line carries only one bit of information with a fixed meaning, namely "an event that requires attention has occurred in a device on this interrupt line".

I/O operations can slow memory access if the address and data buses are shared. This is because the peripheral device is usually much slower than main memory. In some architectures, port-mapped I/O operates via a dedicated I/O bus, alleviating the problem.

One merit of memory-mapped I/O is that, by discarding the extra complexity that port I/O brings, a CPU requires less internal logic and is thus cheaper, faster, easier to build, consumes less power and can be physically smaller; this follows the basic tenets of reduced instruction set computing, and is also advantageous in embedded systems. The other advantage is that, because regular memory instructions are used to address devices, all of the CPU's addressing modes are available for the I/O as well as the memory, and instructions that perform an ALU operation directly on a memory operand (loading an operand from a memory location, storing the result to a memory location, or both) can be used with I/O device registers as well. In contrast, port-mapped I/O instructions are often very limited, often providing only for simple load-and-store operations between CPU registers and I/O ports, so that, for example, to add a constant to a port-mapped device register would require three instructions: read the port to a CPU register, add the constant to the CPU register, and write the result back to the port.

As 16-bit processors have become obsolete and replaced with 32-bit and 64-bit in general use, reserving ranges of memory address space for I/O is less of a problem, as the memory address space of the processor is usually much larger than the required space for all memory and I/O devices in a system. Therefore, it has become more frequently practical to take advantage of the benefits of memory-mapped I/O. However, even with address space being no longer a major concern, neither I/O mapping method is universally superior to the other, and there will be cases where using port-mapped I/O is still preferable.

=== x86 ===
Memory-mapped I/O is preferred in IA-32 and x86-64 based architectures because the instructions that perform port-based I/O are limited to one register: EAX, AX, and AL. The port address is determined by either a byte-sized immediate value in the instruction or a value in DX register. In contrast, any general-purpose register can send or receive data to or from memory and memory-mapped I/O devices; memory-mapped I/O uses fewer instructions and can run faster than port I/O. AMD did not extend the port I/O instructions when defining the x86-64 architecture to support 64-bit ports, so 64-bit transfers cannot be performed using port I/O.

On newer Intel platforms beginning with 2008 5 series, I/O devices on the chipset directly communicate via a dedicated Direct Media Interface (DMI) bus. (Note: See Intel datasheets on specific CPU family e.g. 2014 "10th Generation Intel Processor Families" (PDF). Intel. April 2020.;)

== Memory barriers ==
Since the caches mediate accesses to memory addresses, data written to different addresses may reach the peripherals' memory or registers out of the program order, i.e. if software writes data to an address and then writes data to another address, the cache write buffer does not guarantee that the data will reach the peripherals in that order. Any program that does not include cache-flushing instructions after each write in the sequence may see unintended IO effects if a cache system optimizes the write order. Writes to memory can often be reordered to reduce redundancy or to make better use of memory access cycles without changing the final state of what got stored; whereas, the same optimizations might completely change the meaning and effect of writes to memory-mapped I/O regions.

Lack of foresight in the choice of memory-mapped I/O regions led to many of the RAM-capacity barriers in older generations of computers. Designers rarely expected machines to grow to make full use of an architecture's theoretical RAM capacity, and thus often used some of the high-order bits of the address-space as selectors for memory-mapped I/O functions. For example, the 640 KB barrier in the IBM PC and derivatives is due to reserving the region between 640 and 1024 KB (64k segments 10 through 16) for the Upper Memory Area. This choice initially made little impact, but it eventually limited the total amount of RAM available within the 20-bit available address space. The 3 GB barrier and PCI hole are similar manifestations of this with 32-bit address spaces, exacerbated by details of the x86 boot process and MMU design. 64-bit architectures often technically have similar issues, but these only rarely have practical consequences.

== Examples ==
A sample system memory map
| Address range (hexadecimal) | Size | Device |
|---|---|---|
| 0000–7FFF | 32 KiB | RAM |
| 8000–80FF | 256 bytes | General-purpose I/O |
| 9000–90FF | 256 bytes | Sound controller |
| A000–A7FF | 2 KiB | Video controller/text-mapped display RAM |
| C000–FFFF | 16 KiB | ROM |

A simple system built around an 8-bit microprocessor might provide 16-bit address lines, allowing it to address up to 64 kibibytes (KiB) of memory. On such a system, the first 32 KiB of address space may be allotted to random access memory (RAM), another 16 KiB to read-only memory (ROM) and the remainder to a variety of other devices such as timers, counters, video display chips, sound generating devices, etc.

The hardware of the system is arranged so that devices on the address bus will only respond to particular addresses which are intended for them, while all other addresses are ignored. This is the job of the address decoding circuitry, and that establishes the memory map of the system. As a result, system's memory map may look like in the table on the right. This memory map contains gaps, which is also quite common in actual system architectures.

Assuming the fourth register of the video controller sets the background colour of the screen, the CPU can set this colour by writing a value to the memory location A003 using its standard memory write instruction. Using the same method, graphs can be displayed on a screen by writing character values into a special area of RAM within the video controller. Prior to cheap RAM that enabled bit-mapped displays, this character cell method was a popular technique for computer video displays (see Text user interface).

== Basic types of address decoding ==
Address decoding types, in which a device may decode addresses completely or incompletely, include the following:

Complete (exhaustive) decoding
1:1 mapping of unique addresses to one hardware register (physical memory location). Involves checking every line of the address bus.
Incomplete (partial) decoding
n:1 mapping of n unique addresses to one hardware register. Partial decoding allows a memory location to have more than one address, allowing the programmer to reference a memory location using n different addresses. It may also be done to simplify the decoding hardware by using simpler and often cheaper logic that examines only some address lines, when not all of the CPU's address space is needed. Commonly, the decoding itself is programmable, so the system can reconfigure its own memory map as required, though this is a newer development and generally in conflict with the intent of being cheaper.
Synonyms: foldback, multiply mapped, partially mapped, address aliasing.
Linear decoding
Address lines are used directly without any decoding logic. This is done with devices such as RAMs and ROMs that have a sequence of address inputs, and with peripheral chips that have a similar sequence of inputs for addressing a bank of registers. Linear addressing is rarely used alone (only when there are few devices on the bus, as using purely linear addressing for more than one device usually wastes a lot of address space) but instead is combined with one of the other methods to select a device or group of devices within which the linear addressing selects a single register or memory location.

== Port I/O via device drivers ==
In Windows-based computers, memory can also be accessed via specific drivers such as DOLLx8KD which gives I/O access in 8-, 16- and 32-bit on most Windows platforms starting from Windows 95 up to Windows 7. Installing I/O port drivers will ensure memory access by activating the drivers with simple DLL calls allowing port I/O and when not needed, the driver can be closed to prevent unauthorized access to the I/O ports.

Linux provides the pcimem utility to allow reading from and writing to MMIO addresses. The Linux kernel also allows tracing MMIO access from kernel modules (drivers) using the kernel's mmiotrace debug facility. To enable this, the Linux kernel should be compiled with the corresponding option enabled. mmiotrace is used for debugging closed-source device drivers.

== See also ==
- Programmed input–output
- mmap, not to be confused with memory-mapped I/O
- Memory-mapped file
- General-purpose input/output
- Early examples of computers with port-mapped I/O
  - PDP-8
  - Nova
- PDP-11, an early example of a computer architecture using memory-mapped I/O
  - Unibus, a memory and I/O bus used by the PDP-11
- Bank switching
- Ralf Brown's Interrupt List
- Coprocessor
- Direct memory access
- Advanced Configuration and Power Interface (ACPI)
- Speculative execution CPU vulnerabilities
