= Timeline of DOS operating systems =

Events in the history of 16-bit x86 DOS-family disk operating systems

This article presents a timeline of events in the history of 16-bit x86 DOS-family disk operating systems from 1980 to present. Non-x86 operating systems named "DOS" are not part of the scope of this timeline.

Also presented is a timeline of events in the history of the 8-bit 8080-based and 16-bit x86-based CP/M operating systems from 1974 to 2014, as well as the hardware and software developments from 1973 to 1995 which formed the foundation for the initial version and subsequent enhanced versions of these operating systems.

Color key
Microsoft: 86-DOS, MS-DOS
IBM: PC DOS
Digital Research: CP/M, DR-DOS
Compaq MS-DOS
FreeDOS, GNU/DOS
Other

DOS releases have been in the forms of:

- OEM adaptation kits (OAKs) – all Microsoft releases before version 3.2 were OAKs only
- Shrink wrap packaged product for smaller OEMs (system builders) – starting with MS-DOS 3.2 in 1986,
  Microsoft offered these in addition to OAKs
- End-user retail – all versions of IBM PC DOS (and other OEM-adapted versions) were sold to end users.
  DR-DOS began selling to end users with version 5.0 in July 1990, followed by MS-DOS 5.0 in June 1991
- Free download – starting with OpenDOS 7.01 in 1997, followed by FreeDOS alpha 0.05 in 1998
  (FreeDOS project was announced in 1994)

== DOS era version overview (1980–1995) ==
First end-user releases of IBM–Microsoft-compatible versions Major market-leading releases and releases introducing significant new technology
Date	Version	Primary developer	Notable introduction	IBM hardware
August 1980	86-DOS 0.10	Tim Paterson	First Seattle Computer release	
August 1981	PC DOS 1.0	Microsoft	First IBM release	IBM Personal Computer
May 1982	PC DOS 1.1	Microsoft	Double-sided disks	Upgraded IBM Personal Computer
March 1983	PC DOS 2.0	Microsoft	Hard disk drive, subdirectories, device drivers	IBM Personal Computer XT
November 1983	PC DOS 2.1	Microsoft	Half-height disk drives, ROM cartridges	IBM PCjr
August 1984	PC DOS 3.0	Microsoft	Support for larger disks	IBM Personal Computer/AT
April 1985	PC DOS 3.1	Microsoft	Local area networking support	IBM PC Network
March 1986	PC DOS 3.2	Microsoft	3 1/2-inch 720 KB floppy support	Token Ring network IBM PC Convertible
April 1987	PC DOS 3.3	IBM	3 1/2-inch 1.44 MB floppy support, extended partitions	IBM Personal System/2
November 1987	MS-DOS 3.31	Compaq	Hard disk partitions over 32 MB	
May 1988	DR DOS 3.31	Digital Research	ROMable DOS	
July 1988	IBM DOS 4.0	IBM	DOS Shell, EMS 4.0 usage	
April 1990	DR DOS 5.0	Digital Research	Memory management	
June 1991	MS-DOS 5.0	Microsoft	MS-DOS Editor, QBasic, first retail upgrade	
September 1991	DR DOS 6.0	Digital Research	Disk compression (AddStor's SuperStor)	
March 1993	MS-DOS 6.0	Microsoft	Disk utilities, DoubleSpace disk compression	
June 1993	PC DOS 6.1	IBM	First IBM release after split with Microsoft, E	
September 1993	MS-DOS 6.2	Microsoft	Improved version of DoubleSpace	
February 1994	MS-DOS 6.21	Microsoft	DoubleSpace removed due to legal injunction	
April 1994	PC DOS 6.3	IBM	SuperStor/DS disk compression	
June 1994	MS-DOS 6.22	Microsoft	Last Microsoft release; DriveSpace disk compression	
April 1995	PC DOS 7.0	IBM	Memory optimizations, Stacker disk compression, Rexx	

== 1973–1980: Hardware foundations and CP/M ==
- 8-bit CP/M : First licensed release
- 1.3
- 1.4
- 2.0
- 3.0

1973		Some 200 Intel customers have used the MCS-4 and MCS-8 microcomputer chip sets introduced in 1971 and 1972 in more than 60 applications, including: point-of-sale terminals; typewriter-sized general-purpose data processing machines that tabulate accounts, type invoices, and write checks and personalized form letters; process controllers for automatic bottle-loading machines; and a front-end processor in a dial-up communications controller. Microcomputers are increasingly used in systems too small or slow to warrant use of minicomputers. Intel's support for system-building includes SIM4-01 and SIM8-01 prototyping boards that form functioning micro computers, programmable read-only memory (PROM) programmers, and a PROM-based assembler. Intel introduces the 2048-bit (256-byte) erasable 1702A EPROM chip. It can be programmed in two minutes using Intel's punched paper tape-actuated programmer, and erased as often as needed by shining an ultraviolet light through a transparent quartz cap on the package. Intel claims its first two microcomputers command about 99% of the market which Fairchild Semiconductor, National Semiconductor and Rockwell International have joined.
1973		IBM introduces the IBM 3740 data entry system. It uses IBM's first read/write diskette, a single-sided 8-inch-diameter "memory disk"—a new recording medium to replace punched cards. Each diskette can hold as much data as 3,000 standard 80-column punched cards. See also: History of the floppy disk
1973		The Intel 8008-based Micral N, the first personal computer using a microprocessor, is offered for sale. The 8-bit 8008 has a 14-bit address bus that can address 2^{14} (16,384) memory locations, or 16 KB of memory.
1973		IBM introduces Winchester hard disk drive technology with the IBM 3340 direct access storage device for use on their System/370 mainframes. See also: History of hard disk drives
1973		Gary Kildall, a Naval Postgraduate School instructor and consultant to Intel, writes PL/M for the 8008, the first programming language and first compiler specifically for microprocessors. It's a cross compiler written in ANSI standard Fortran IV so it will run on most computers, including a PDP-10. However, the 8008's seven-level subroutine call stack is too small to support a self-hosted compiler. Kildall also wrote an 8008 simulator in Fortran IV.
1973		At the June National Computer Conference in the New York Coliseum, Intel introduces two microcomputers, the Intellec 4 (4004) and 8 (8008). The Intellecs have resident monitors stored in ROMs. The Intellec 8 supported a Teletype operating at 110 baud, a high speed punched tape reader and a CRT terminal at 1200 baud.
1973		In July, Intel debuts its model 2107 4,096-bit (4-kilobit) n-MOS RAM, which competes with 4kb RAMs from TI, Mostek and Microsystems International. It's slow compared with 1kb RAMs such as the p-MOS 1103 and the n-MOS 2105. Nearly all new computers, regardless of size, now come with a semiconductor memory or a choice between semiconductors and cores.
1973		On a summer job at Vancouver, Washington working for TRW, a contractor for the Bonneville Power Administration, in his spare time Paul Allen adapts the PDP-10 Macro Assembler and DDT debugger to create an 8008 simulator that lets Bill Gates develop code for their 8008-based Traf-O-Data computer built by Paul Gilbert. Allen had previously tried, without success, writing the simulator on the IBM System/360 at Washington State University, where he was studying computer science.
1974		Intel releases the 8-bit 8080 (cost $360, compared to the dominant and far more powerful IBM System/360's millions), which has a 16-bit address bus that can address 2^{16} (65,536) memory locations, or 64 KB of memory. The 8080's enhanced stack makes self-hosted high level language development feasible.
1974		Information Terminals Corporation (ITC) introduces the first two-sided, double-capacity floppy disk—the model FF34-2000 flippy disk, compatible with IBM's 8-inch disk.
1974		Lacking an affordable reader for 16-channel paper tapes, the Traf-O-Data partners turn to a local inventor. At a demo for the King County Engineering Department, their contraption malfunctioned, prompting Gates to bite the bullet and spend about $3,400 for the more reliable Enviro-Labs GS-311 tape reader.
1974		Kildall writes CP/M, a simple "Control Program/Monitor" for an Intel 8080-based Intellec 8, to test out his updated PL/M compiler for the 8080. CP/M, written in PL/M, was finished months before the hardware to run it on was completed, by using a PDP-10 to simulate the 8080. CP/M runs in approximately 3 1/2 kilobytes (KB) of memory. Convinced that magnetic-disk storage would make the Intellec 8 more efficient, Kildall interfaced the computer with an 8-inch Shugart Associates floppy disk drive using a custom built floppy disk controller. Kildall's friend John Torode developed the controller hardware while Kildall worked on the disk operating system software. Believing, along with Intel's designers, that the microprocessor would run embedded systems such as digital watches, they market their hardware and software together—not as a microcomputer, but as a development system, used for programming Intel 1602A PROM or erasable 1702A EPROM chips which are plugged into a socket on the Intellec 8's front panel.
1975		The Micro Instrumentation and Telemetry Systems (MITS) Altair 8800 is introduced, sparking the microcomputer revolution. Gates and Allen found Microsoft based on Altair BASIC, which they co-developed with Monte Davidoff and for the first 1 1/2 years primarily distributed on paper tape. MITS later distributes BASIC on cassette tape, supported by the Altair 88-ACR (Audio Cassette Recorder) interface boards. Cassettes were popular for another 1 1/2 years, before floppy disks took over. The Altair's S-100 bus eventually becomes the first de facto standard microcomputer expansion bus, as by April 1980 there were probably over 200,000 installed S-100 systems, more than TRS-80, PET and Apple II systems.
1975		Kildall and Torode sell their first two machines and a word processor for newspaper editing to Omron, a small San Francisco computer terminal subsidiary of a Japanese electronics firm, splitting $25,000. Omron was the first company to license CP/M, for their intelligent terminal. CP/M also monitored programs in the Lawrence Livermore National Laboratory Octopus network.
1975		The IBM 5100 Portable Computer, the first portable computer, is introduced. Mass storage is provided by quarter-inch cartridge (QIC) magnetic tape drives.
1975		In December, IMS Associates, Inc. ships their first fifty IMSAI 8080 kits. They market their clone of the Altair 8800 as a "commercial grade" microcomputer system.
1975		1975 market shares for low-cost data recording devices, according to a Venture Development Corp. study: Cassettes 73%, Floppies 22%, Cartridges 5%. The cassette was expected to retain its leadership position through 1980.
1976		IBM introduces more hardware components for its 3600 finance communication system, including the first double-sided (dual head) floppy drive. ITC adjusts Flippy (now a registered trademark) production to accommodate the new drive.
1976		IMSAI ships a lot of disk subsystems, promising that an operating system (OS) would follow; Kildall adapts CP/M to the IMSAI hardware, rewriting the parts that manage devices like diskette controllers and CRTs. Having adapted CP/M for four different controllers, and somewhat reluctant to adapt it to yet another, Kildall designs a general interface, which he calls the BIOS (Basic Input/Output System), that a good programmer could change on the spot for their hardware, e.g. Rob Barnaby for the IMSAI VDP-80 in 1977. This approach would be reinvented years later as the "hardware abstraction layer." Kildall founds Digital Research and releases CP/M version 1.3 as a commercial product, at $70 per copy. His wife sends diskettes to customers responding to an ad they ran in Dr. Dobb's Journal, whose editor Jim Warren advocated sale of CP/M to the general public. An ad runs in the December Byte as well. Demand for the diskettes was slow at first.
1976		Shugart introduces the (single-sided) minifloppy, the first 5 1/4-inch floppy drive.
1977		Torode's Digital Systems runs an ad in Byte for its Altair/IMSAI (S-100) bus floppy disk system.
1977		IMSAI marketing director Seymour I. Rubinstein paid Kildall $25,000 for the right to run CP/M version 1.3, which eventually evolved into IMDOS, on IMSAI 8080 computers. Other manufacturers follow and CP/M eventually becomes the de facto standard 8-bit operating system.
1977		Tandon Magnetics files a patent for its double-sided ferrite disk read-and-write heads, which improved on IBM's design by employing a fixed transducer on one side and a movable transducer on the other side, and offered its Series 200 heads to OEMs. Eventually IBM, Shugart and other manufacturers became licensees of Tandon's patent. Later, Shugart introduces their double-sided, double-headed, double density minifloppy drive.
1978		Intel releases the 16-bit Intel 8086 microprocessor, which has a 20-bit address bus that can address 2^{20} (1,048,576) memory locations, or one megabyte of segmented memory.
1978		CP/M version 1.4, now priced at $100, is released.
1978		IEEE proposes an S-100 standard, introducing a 16-bit data bus to the S-100.
1978		Rubinstein founds MicroPro International. Its WordStar word processor application would become a de facto standard.
1979	January	Seattle Computer Products' Tim Paterson finishes the design of his first 8086 CPU card for the S-100 bus.
1979	May	Paterson, with his working two-card prototype boardset installed in a Cromemco Z-2 box, drives to Microsoft to try it with Microsoft's Standalone Disk BASIC-86—a version of BASIC with a rudimentary built-in operating system—which Bob O'Rear developed for the 8086 by simulating the 8086 chip on a DEC computer. After eliminating a few minor bugs, Microsoft had a working 8086 BASIC.
1979	May	Kildall confirms to The Intelligent Machines Journal that he is working on CP/M 2.0, for both 8080- and 8086-based systems.
1979	June	Microsoft and Paterson attend the National Computer Conference in New York City to show Microsoft's 8086 BASIC running on Seattle Computer's system, sharing Lifeboat Associates' ten-by-ten-foot booth. At that meeting, Paterson is introduced to Microsoft's MDOS operating system (later renamed to MIDAS), which used a variant of Standalone BASIC's 8-bit File Allocation Table (FAT) file system.
1979	July	Intel releases the Intel 8088 microprocessor, a lower cost variant of the 8086 which has an 8-bit external data bus instead of the 16-bit bus of the 8086 (the 16-bit registers and one megabyte address space were unchanged). To the programmer, the 8086 and 8088 instruction sets are identical, except for execution speed. The 8088 uses lower cost 8-bit RAM.
1979	November	Seattle Computer Products ships its first 8086 card. Standalone Microsoft BASIC is the only major software product that runs on it.
1979	November	Onyx Systems and Intelligent Business Machines Corp. announce that CP/M 2.0 is available for their systems.
1980	January	Omnix, advertised as a CP/M-compatible Unix-like operating system for Z80-based microcomputers, is released by Yourdon. It reportedly took over 50 KB of memory by itself and required some sort of bank-switching or extended address scheme to run any programs. Yourdon later withdrew the product due to software bugs.
1980	March	CP/M 2.1 is released, fixing bugs in version 2.0. MP/M, the multitasking, multi-user version of CP/M, is just a "shell" that fits around CP/M 2.1.

== 1980–1995: Important events in DOS history ==
- 1980
- 81
- 82
- 83
- 84
- 85
- 86
- 87
- 88
- 89
- 1990
- 91
- 92
- 93
- 94
- 95

1980	April	Paterson begins writing an operating system for use with Seattle Computer Products' 8086-based computer, due to delays by Digital Research in releasing an operating system for the 8086 and 8088, and concerns about CP/M's shortcomings.
1980	April	Microsoft introduces the Z-80 SoftCard, which lets Apple users run CP/M.
1980	June	Shugart Technology releases the ST-506, the first 5 1/4-inch Winchester disk drive—price: $1,500.
1980	July	IBM first contacts Microsoft to look the company over. Their secret Project Chess needs both programming languages and an operating system.
1980	August	Paterson's operating system, which he calls QDOS 0.10 ("Quick and Dirty Operating System"), ships. It's crammed into 6 KB of code. Seattle Computer Products runs an ad in Byte marketing it as 86-DOS for $95. Seattle Computer contacts Microsoft about adapting Microsoft BASIC for the new operating system, proposing a cross-licensing arrangement.
1980	August	Microsoft announces Xenix, a port of Version 7 Unix to x86 computers, saying that it will prevent a 16-bit software crisis. Xenix will also be available for the PDP-11 as early as October; Motorola 68000 and Zilog Z8000 versions are also coming. Interest in Unix as "the next CP/M" resulted in the creation of several Unix-like operating systems, including an Onyx Systems version for the Z8000.
1980	September	Allen negotiates an agreement with Seattle Computer for a non-exclusive sublicense for 86-DOS to an unnamed OEM customer for $25,000. All that was left was to translate the terms into a formal contract within 60 days.
1980	October	Digital Research announces CP/M-86 for Intel 8086/8088 microcomputers. The file format of CP/M, Release 2, was retained for compatibility.
1980	November	IBM signs a contract to license Pascal, COBOL, FORTRAN and BASIC compilers, a BASIC interpreter and an operating system for Project Chess from Microsoft.
1980	December	Seattle Computer releases 86-DOS 0.3.
1981	January	Microsoft and Seattle Computer formally sign their agreement. Exhibit "A" of the agreement detailed extended 86-DOS features to be developed by Seattle Computer, including "Directory expanded to include date."
1981	January	Digital Research ships CP/M-86 on January 23. Like CP/M, CP/M-86 consists of three major modules: the BIOS, BDOS (Basic Disk Operating System) supporting 60 system calls and the CCP (Console Command Processor). New system calls are mainly for the new memory allocation scheme that CP/M-86 uses. Intel's PL/M-86 was used to generate CP/M-86, which is basically the same as the 8-bit version, with the addition of file system enhancements as well as memory management.
1981	February	O'Rear gets 86-DOS to run on IBM's prototype computer. 86-DOS had to be converted from 8-inch to 5 1/4-inch floppy disks and integrated with the BIOS, which Microsoft was helping IBM to write. An Intellec ICE-88 in-circuit emulator expedited the debugging.
1981	April	Paterson finishes, and Seattle Computer releases, 86-DOS 1.0 – presumably completing the requirements specified in Exhibit "A" of the Microsoft agreement.
1981	May	Paterson leaves Seattle Computer Products for Microsoft and joins O'Rear to help finish adapting 86-DOS to IBM's prototype hardware.
1981	June	Lifeboat Associates, the leading independent distributor of CP/M and CP/M software, offers Seattle Computer Products $200,000 or $250,000 for 86-DOS, to make it Lifeboat's 16-bit standard.
1981	July	Kildall, angry after seeing the API for IBM's secret computer, that IBM had let selected programmers have, meets with IBM and agrees not to sue IBM for CP/M copyright infringement; IBM agrees to market CP/M-86 alongside DOS, but could not agree to set a price—according to Kildall's attorney, "They told us they feared it would be a violation of antitrust laws." Immediately afterwards, IBM sent their prototype machine to Kildall so that CP/M-86 could be installed. Digital Research hired consultant Andy Johnson-Laird to customize CP/M-86 for IBM's computer, and Johnson-Laird quickly discovered O'Rear's name in the boot sector of IBM's floppy. Johnson-Laird said that Kildall "went ashen" when he saw that.
1981	July	On July 27, Microsoft buys all rights to 86-DOS from Seattle Computer Products, initially for a further $50,000 and favorable licenses back from Microsoft. After settling a 1986 SCP lawsuit, the total cost to Microsoft was $1 million.
1981	August	Microsoft delivers its adapted 86-DOS 1.14 to IBM. The product includes three major modules: the BIOS initialization module SYSINIT, the kernel (IBMDOS.COM), including the DOS API, and the shell (COMMAND.COM) supporting internal commands COPY, DIR, ERASE, RENAME and TYPE, plus Paterson's EDLIN line editor and DEBUG debugger, linker LINK.EXE and a few external commands: FORMAT, CHKDSK, SYS, BASIC, BASICA, DATE and TIME (the latter two added on IBM's request). This product was later called MS-DOS 1.0 by Microsoft. Similar in many ways to CP/M, it consisted of 4000 lines of assembly language source code and ran in 8 KB of memory.
1981	August	IBM announces the IBM Personal Computer (PC), model number 5150, featuring: a 4.77-MHz clock rate Intel 8088 CPU; 16, 32, 48 or 64 KB (KiB) motherboard DRAM (1–4 banks of nine Mostek MK4116-compatible 16-kilobit 16-pin DIP chips, expandable via expansion card(s) to 256 KB). The ninth bit is the parity bit; 40 KB ROM (8 KB BIOS and 32 KB BASIC) and an empty 8 KB ROM expansion socket; IBM Cassette BASIC, cassette operating system, power-on self-test, I/O drivers, graphic patterns for 128 characters in graphics mode, disk bootstrap loader; mass storage devices: IBM cassette tape, supported by the BIOS and Cassette BASIC ROM—no disk operating system required, or supports it. Few were sold; up to two IBM-labeled Tandon Magnetics TM100-1 160 KB (163,840 bytes) (Note: 1 side × 40 tracks per side × 8 sectors per track × 512 bytes per sector = 163,840 bytes) single-sided, double density (i.e., 40-track), eight 512-byte sectors per track 5 1/4-inch soft sectored, MFM-encoded full-height floppy disk drives; either: 4 KB RAM Monochrome Display Adapter (MDA) displaying 80 columns by 25 lines in text mode (alphanumeric) with 720×350-pixel display resolution on the IBM 5151 monochrome monitor, (Note: The monitor displays a grid of 80 × 25 = 2,000 characters. Each character is in a nine-by-14 bit character cell. Thus, the monitor displays (80 × 9) × (25 × 14) = 720 × 350 = 252,000 pixels.) or; 16 KB RAM Color Graphics Adapter (CGA) supporting seven INT 10H video modes including 16-color text or black-and-white (2-color) graphics (all points addressable) with 640×200 resolution and 4-color graphics with 320×200 resolution (Note: Because the CGA text mode uses eight-by-eight bit character cells, which are harder on the eyes, the MDA is generally preferred for text-based applications.); 83-key keyboard • support for 256 text-mode characters (code page 437 in the US) • PC speaker • 63.5 watt power supply; three operating systems: the IBM Personal Computer DOS 1.0 (PC DOS), CP/M-86 and the UCSD p-System, and Pascal compiler.; IBM combined SYSINIT with its customized ROM-BIOS interface code to create the BIOS extensions file IBMBIO.COM, the DOS-BIOS which deals with input/output handling, or device handling, and added a few external commands of their own: COMP, DISKCOMP, DISKCOPY, and MODE (configure printer) to finish their product. The 160 KB DOS diskette also included 23 sample BASIC programs demonstrating the abilities of the PC, including the game DONKEY.BAS. The two system files, IBMBIO.COM and IBMDOS.COM, are hidden. The first sector of DOS-formatted diskettes is the boot record. Two copies of the File Allocation Table occupy the two sectors which follow the boot record. Sectors four through seven hold the root directory. The remaining 313 sectors (160,256 bytes) store the data contents of files. Disk space is allocated in clusters, which are one-sector in length. Because an 8-bit FAT can't support over 300 clusters, Paterson implemented a new 12-bit FAT, which would be called FAT12. (Note: The FAT is a table with one entry for every cluster, indicating whether the cluster is in use or available. The biggest number 8 bits can store is 255; FAT12 has room for 340 entries in a 512-byte sector: 340 × 1.5 = 510 + 2 reserved bytes = 512) DOS 1.0 diskettes have up to 64 32-byte directory entries, holding the 8-byte filename, 3-byte filename extension, 1-byte file attribute (with a hidden bit, system bit and six undefined bits), 12 bytes reserved for future use, 2-byte last modified date, 2-byte starting cluster number and 4-byte file size. The two standard formats for program files are COM and EXE; a Program Segment Prefix is built when they are loaded into memory. The third kind of command processing file is the batch file. AUTOEXEC.BAT is checked for, and executed by COMMAND.COM at start-up. Special batch file commands are PAUSE and REM. I/O is made device independent by treating peripherals as if they were files. Whenever the reserved filenames CON: (console), PRN: (printer), or AUX: (auxiliary serial port) appear in the File Control Block of a file named in a command, all operations are directed to the device. The video controller, floppy disk controller, further memory, serial and parallel ports are added via up to five 8-bit PC bus expansion cards. Delivery of the computer is scheduled for October.
1981	October	An InfoWorld article asks, "Which Operating System Will Prevail?". Potential software developers must decide whether DOS or CP/M-86 will become the IBM PC standard. Rubinstein asserted that CP/M would be the winner. Nevertheless, MicroPro has made sure that WordStar will be available for both.
1981	October	Lifeboat Associates, having lost its bid for rights to 86-DOS, announced that it will market Microsoft's MS-DOS under the name Software Bus-86 (SB-86). Their line of trademarked Software Bus products included SB-80, Lifeboat's version of CP/M.
1981	November	Many of the approximately 50,000 attendees of the Northeast Computer Show in Boston keep IBM's booth packed with people interested in the new IBM Personal Computer and the Datamaster. A two-page IBM ad in InfoWorld features a picture of the components of the PC and invites readers to write to IBM's Personal Computer Software department who will consider programs submitted by outside programmers for publishing by IBM.
1981	November	Microsoft signs its first major DOS deal at COMDEX, with Chuck Peddle's new startup company Sirius Systems Technology, whose Victor 9000 was among the first of many 16-bit computers similar to and better than the IBM PC—but incompatible with it. Earlier, Microsoft signed its first DOS customer, Cleveland's Tecmar, but they put their 8086 machine on the back burner when they became a major player in the PC peripherals business.
1981	December	Digital Research releases MP/M 2.0 and MP/M-86 multi-user or concurrent single-user multiprogramming monitor control programs (operating systems) which support multiterminal access with multiprogramming at each terminal. Kildall told InfoWorld that it took Digital Research three months to develop CP/M-86, while MP/M-86 (suggested retail $500) took four-man-years (two actual years). Solving the problem of concurrency, among other things, accounted for the extra MP/M-86 development time. In concurrent systems, several functions, organized by the operating system, run simultaneously, using different files. These functions operate in the background, or multiground if there is more than one function operating. While this is happening, the user works on another task using the terminal screen, i.e., the foreground. The minimum system memory requirement for MP/M-86 is 128 KB.
1981	December	A Seattle Computer ad in InfoWorld offers an 8086 system with 86-DOS under its new name MS-DOS, noting that MS-DOS is "also called 86-DOS, IBM PC-DOS, Lifeboat SB-86". Seattle Computer was the first company to offer the product under the MS-DOS name.
1982	January	The U.S. Justice Department drops its 13-year case against IBM, that had sought to break up the firm that has dominated the computer industry, saying the suit was "without merit and should be dismissed." Government lawyers said the case was outdated because IBM no longer enjoyed a virtual monopoly in the computer industry. Time called it "the case of the century" in 1979, in the midst of a five-year trial in which the defense eventually called 856 witnesses.
1982	January	Corvus Systems released interfaces to make its line of Winchester disk drive systems and local area network (LAN) fully hardware- and software-compatible with the IBM PC. Corvus offers storage capacities of 5, 10 and 20 MB on 5 1/4-in. and 8-in. Winchester disk systems. Prices range from $3,750 to 6,450. The Corvus Omninet local network scheme can spread the cost of a hard disk drive among several users. Omninet, which uses twisted pair cabling, is billed as a low-cost alternative to more costly coaxial-based networks such as Ethernet.
1982	March	Paterson finishes work on the first DOS upgrade, quits Microsoft and returns to work for Seattle Computer.
1982	April	At a recent meeting of the Homebrew Computer Club, members learned about Intel's just-announced iAPX 286 superchip. Digital Research is producing an operating system for the 286. MP/M-286 will exploit the processor's memory management and protection. Intel is supplying Digital Research with the hardware to develop and test MP/M-286. Intel's marketing manager also spoke briefly of the planned iAPX 432, Intel's next major processor.
1982	April	On April 5, IBM releases CP/M-86 (price: $240) as the third operating system it is offering for the IBM PC, after a delay for functional, usability and performance testing (when first loaded out of the box, it displays the date 2/10/82, perhaps suggesting when it was finished). For about six months PC DOS was the only operating system available for the PC. Recently, IBM also released the UCSD p-System. Existing CP/M-86 programs running on other computers must be converted to run on the IBM PC. Partly because CP/M-86 was priced six times higher than PC DOS (price: $40), it fails to challenge PC DOS as the 16-bit industry standard. 96 percent of the early PC owners chose DOS over CP/M or the p-System.
1982	April	Digital Research announces Concurrent CP/M-86, aka Concurrent CP/M, a new CP/M-86-compatible single-user multitasking operating system. Concurrent CP/M allows users to go from one screen to another at the push of a key and programs to directly address up to 1 MB of memory. The first implementation will be on the IBM Displaywriter. The Concurrent CP/M project was an offshoot of MP/M development, and the two programs share a lot in common, including a real-time nucleus that is the essential element in the system that allows programs to run simultaneously. The enthusiastic introduction of Concurrent CP/M is clear evidence that Kildall is betting on a future with powerful personal computers, not multi-user systems linking dumb terminals to a central processor.
1982	April	Microsoft runs an ad in InfoWorld promoting MS-DOS to OEMs.
1982	May	Rodent Associates announced its incorporation as an optical mouse engineering firm. The mouse is called a Fitts's law pointing device by human factors researchers, meaning that it points as well as the human finger.
1982	May	The Context MBA, the first integrated software package, ships. It combines financial modeling, graphics, relational database management and word processing in one program.
1982	May	IBM releases an upgraded PC with IBM PC DOS 1.1 which supports its Tandon TM100-2 320 KB (327,680 bytes) double-sided, double-density floppy disk drive. The double-sided directory increased from four to seven sectors, allowing up to 112 directory entries, leaving 630 sectors, i.e. 315 clusters (322,560 bytes) for data (cluster size doubled to two sectors). The 2-byte last modified time was inserted at the end of the directory's reserved field, reducing the reserved field to 10 bytes. Timestamping on files is useful for incremental backup with the Corvus hard disk. Based on MS-DOS 1.24 as of March 1982, PC DOS 1.1 still ships on a 160 KB diskette. The DEL command is added as a synonymous name for the ERASE command and REN is an abbreviated name for RENAME. DATE and TIME become internal commands. The EXE2BIN command is added and MODE is enhanced to configure serial ports and redirect printing to a serial port. A "P" MODE option causes continuous retries when a device is not ready, by making a portion of MODE permanently resident in memory. BIOS modifications permit DOS to recognize whether a disk is single or double sided. IBM also released the Microsoft BASIC compiler. All five Microsoft languages are now available—FORTRAN released in December, and COBOL last month. Also available is Microsoft's Macro Assembler. A typical PC with 320 KB of disk storage, keyboard, printer, monochrome display and MDA costs $3695.
1982	June	Microsoft releases MS-DOS 1.25 (equivalent to PC DOS 1.1; system files are IO.SYS and MSDOS.SYS; GW-BASIC is an entirely disk-based substitute for BASICA). Columbia Data Products introduces the MPC, the first PC clone—which runs MS-DOS 1.25—soon followed by others including Eagle Computer. These machines were not 100% IBM PC compatible. Satisfying "near-compatible" OEM requests for IBM compatibility proved difficult, and not until version 3.1 was Microsoft able to supply a system that other OEMs agreed was identical with IBM's.
1982	June	Peter Norton, a pioneer in the DOS-based utility software industry, advertises his utilities in the third issue of PC Magazine. Norton sells programs providing disk editor functionality and an UNERASE program which solved "a common problem to which there was no readily available solution." Microsoft would not provide a solution until version 5.0 of MS-DOS, and over a decade would pass before Windows 95's Recycle Bin appeared. Initially the programs were sold separately, but by October Norton offered them as a package called The Norton Utilities. Earlier, an UNERASE program to restore files accidentally deleted by CP/M's ERAse command was marketed for CP/M-based systems by MicroDaSys.
1982	August	IBM introduces a new 64 KB memory-expansion card, expandable to 256 KB by adding three 64 KB RAM module kits. Two fully loaded expansion cards added 512 KB (cost $2150) to the main board's 64 KB, giving the PC 576 KB of memory.
1982	August	The MDA-compatible Hercules Graphics Card is introduced. It added a 720×348 monochrome graphics mode, adequate for drawing bar graphs, pie charts, and other business graphics. Most DOS software packages would support it as a de facto display standard, but DOS provided no graphics support, so every program manipulated the board's registers and video memory directly via special drivers. Color graphics are not considered important for business computing, and computers featuring color graphics (e.g., Apple II, TRS-80 Color Computer and Commodore 64) are largely viewed as home computers.
1982	September	Zenith releases the Z-100. Zenith calls its MS-DOS variant Z-DOS.
1982	October	Mouse Systems' optical mouse, wired to a Sun workstation and an Atari 400 running Missile Command, attracts many observers at the Mini/Micro 82 conference in Anaheim, attended by over 10,000 people—and wins a "best new product" award. Interface cards for the IBM PC will be available when the mouse is released in January.
1982	November	VisiCorp, the top personal computer software firm (built by its VisiCalc spreadsheet for the Apple II), demonstrates its Visi On graphical user interface-based operating environment, or windowing applications manager, at COMDEX. It had been in secret development for two years, and the demo was a loud wakeup call to Bill Gates.
1982	November	Also at COMDEX, Compaq announces the first IBM PC compatible portable computer, the Compaq Portable. Compaq achieved compatibility legally by reverse engineering through clean-room design. The Compaq Portable has a CGA-compatible display adapter which shows its text mode characters with MDA-resolution, effectively combining the virtues of the CGA and the MDA. Its operating system was called COMPAQ-DOS, adding to the confusing host of names for MS-DOS. Microsoft finally insisted that their operating system be called MS-DOS, and eventually everyone but IBM complied. A June 1983 PC Magazine product review said "the Compaq comes with Microsoft's MS-DOS 1.1 operating system, which is almost identical to PC-DOS 1.1". Having already discovered differences between MS-DOS and PC DOS, Compaq continued internally developing COMPAQ-DOS to increase compatibility with the latter.
1983	January	Lotus Development Corp. releases Lotus 1-2-3, which would become the IBM PC's first "killer application", making the PC as VisiCalc made the Apple II and WordStar made the CP/M machines. It was programmed entirely in assembly language and bypassed the slower DOS screen input/output functions in favor of writing directly to memory-mapped video display hardware. This reliance on the specific hardware of the IBM PC led to 1-2-3 being utilized as one of the two litmus test applications for true 100% compatibility (the other was Flight Simulator, for which Bruce Artwick wrote his own purposive built-in OS). The Compaq was the only non-IBM machine that could run 1-2-3.
1983	February	IBM announces a new color display, the IBM 5153 Model 1 for the PC, for presentation of CGA-resolution business data and graphics. Home users can connect a television using a frequency modulator.
1983	February	At the CP/M'83 show in San Francisco, Digital Research announces that it will market a retail version of CP/M-86 for the IBM PC for $60, which includes a print spooler and GSX, which was formerly sold separately.
1983	March	Microsoft releases MS-DOS 2.0, which introduces a Unix/Xenix-like hierarchical file system and installable device drivers (e.g. ANSI.SYS) in the system configuration file CONFIG.SYS—a first step towards plug and play. New internal commands are BREAK, CHDIR or CD, CLS, CTTY, EXIT, MKDIR or MD, PATH, PROMPT, RMDIR or RD, SET (environments), VER, VERIFY and VOL. New external commands are FC, DISKCOPY (not identical to IBM's version), PRINT (spooling); three filters supported with standard devices and redirection: FIND, SORT and MORE; BACKUP, RESTORE and RECOVER. New batch file commands are ECHO, FOR, GOTO, IF and SHIFT. CONFIG.SYS commands are BREAK, BUFFERS, DEVICE, FILES and SHELL. New file attribute bits are read-only, volume label, subdirectory and archive. A team of six developers produced version 2.0, led by Paul Allen, Mark Zbikowski and Aaron Reynolds.
1983	March	The IBM PC/XT, the first PC to store data on a hard disk (10 MB), is announced. It ships with PC DOS 2.0, and introduces nine sectors per track floppy disk formats, which increase floppy storage capacity by about 12%. Single-sided 180 KB (184,320 bytes; 360 sectors) and double-sided 360 KB (368,640 bytes; 720 sectors) diskettes require more than the maximum 340 FAT entries a 512-byte sector can hold, so the FAT size is doubled, leaving 351 sectors (179,712 bytes) for data on single-sided disks and 354 clusters (362,496 bytes) (Note: Clusters on these double-sided disks are two sectors in length: 354 clusters × 2 sectors per cluster × 512 bytes per sector = 362,496 bytes.) on double-sided disks. In addition to Microsoft's new commands in MS-DOS 2.0 (above), IBM adds more including FDISK, the fixed disk (Note: Fixed Disk was IBM's term for the PC's hard drive (i.e., the hard drive was not a removable disk).) setup program, used to write the master boot record which supports up to four partitions on hard drives. Only one DOS partition is allowed, the others are intended for other operating systems such as CP/M-86, UCSD p-System and Xenix. The fixed disk has 10,618,880 bytes (Note: 305 cylinders (the equivalent of tracks) × 2 platters × 2 sides or heads per platter × 17 sectors per track = 20,740 sectors × 512 bytes per sector = 10,618,880 bytes. The fixed disk actually has 306 cylinders numbered 0 through 305. Cylinder 305 is normally reserved for diagnostic use, so only cylinders 0–304 are active.) of raw space. The DOS partition on the fixed disk continues to use the FAT12 format, but with adaptations to support the much larger size of the fixed disk partition compared to floppy disks. Space in the user data area of the disk is allocated in clusters which are fixed at 8 sectors each. With DOS the only partition, the combined overhead is 50 sectors (Note: DOS's FAT is eight sectors (16 sectors for two copies) + 32 sectors for the root directory, room for 512 directory entries + 2 sectors (one master and one DOS boot sector) = 50 sectors) leaving 10,592,256 bytes (Note: (20,740 sectors total space on the drive - 50 sectors of overhead) ÷ 8 sectors per cluster = 2,586 clusters with 2 sectors unused which can not fill an 8 sector cluster. 2,586 clusters * 8 sectors per cluster * 512 bytes per sector = 10,592,256 bytes) for user data. A BIOS parameter block (BPB) is added to volume boot records. PC DOS does not include the FC command, which is similar to COMP. DOS 2 is about 12 KB larger than DOS 1.1 – despite its complex new features, it's only 24 KB of code. Under pressure from IBM to leave sufficient memory available for applications on smaller PC systems, the developers had reduced the system size from triple that of DOS 1.1. Peter Norton found many problems with the release. Interrupts 25h and 26h, which read or write complete sectors, redefined their rules for absolute sector addressing, "sabotaging" programs using these services. The XT motherboard uses 64-kilobit DIP chips, supporting up to 256 KB on board. With 384 KB on expansion cards, users could officially reach the 640 KB barrier of conventional memory. The power supply capacity was doubled to about 130 watts, to accommodate the hard drive.
1983	April	Digital Research releases the last 8-bit version of CP/M, it was major version 3, often called CP/M Plus. It incorporated the bank switching memory management of MP/M in a single-user single-task operating system compatible with CP/M 2.2 applications. CP/M 3 could therefore use more than 64 KB of memory on an 8080 or Zilog Z80 processor. The system could be configured to support date stamping of files. The operating system distribution software also included a relocating assembler and linker. CP/M 3 was available on the last generation of 8-bit computers.
1983	April	Responding to VisiCorp and other competitors working on operating environments, Microsoft's Rao Remala assembles the "Interface Manager" demo which consisted of a screen filled with overlapping windows apparently running programs that really didn't do anything. At Microsoft it became known as the "smoke-and-mirrors" demo.
1983	May	Fujitsu Microelectronics releases the first 256-kilobit DRAM chip, and its Micro 16s computer. A memory board using the 256-kb chips that allows the Micro 16s to store a full megabyte will be made available later this year.
1983	May	At the Spring COMDEX in Atlanta, Microsoft introduces the Microsoft Mouse, priced at $195. It comes in either a bus or serial version, with the Multi-Tool (Note: The Multi-Tool product line began with expert systems for Multiplan.) Notepad, a mouse-based text editor written by Richard Brodie. Microsoft also introduces Multi-Tool Word, designed by Charles Simonyi to work with the mouse. Most watching Simonyi's demonstration had never heard of a mouse. As many as eight documents could be edited at the same time in so-called windows.
1983	June	Microsoft releases the Microsoft Mouse. Initial sales were modest, as there was little you could do with it except run the demonstration programs included in the box (a tutorial, practice app and Notepad) or program interfaces to it. The mouse began shipping in July.
1983	July	Wang Laboratories announced it had developed the Wang SIMM (single in-line memory module), which integrates nine 64-kilobit RAM chips into a .75 by 3-inch space. Wang said the SIMM could lessen the need for 256-kilobit chips which have just started production and are relatively costly, since the SIMM is denser than 256 kb and is available now. The SIMM is being offered to interested semiconductor makers, and National Semiconductor and Zenith Microcircuits have committed to manufacture 64 KB (9 × 64 kb) RAM modules based on the SIMM design. The SIMM's 30 pins are inserted into a plastic chip carrier rather than the gold-plated leadless ceramic chip carrier. Added address pins were included to enable upgrading, and Wang said it will soon assemble 256-kb components around SIMM. National Semiconductor plans to market a modified SIMM with surface-mounted chips in early 1984.
1983	October	IBM releases the IBM 3270 PC, an IBM PC/XT containing added hardware which could emulate the behaviour of an IBM 3270 mainframe terminal.
1983	October	Digital Research releases CP/M-86 Plus Version 3.1, based on the multitasking Concurrent CP/M kernel. It could run up to four tasks at once. CP/M-86 Plus was available for the ACT Apricot PC (UK) and the Olympia PEOPLE computer.
1983	October	The NEC PC-100, modeled blatantly after the Apple Lisa, is the star introduction at Tokyo's Japan Data Show. It runs MS-DOS 2.01, which added support for individual country date, time and currency display formats via the CONFIG.SYS COUNTRY command, and 7000 16-bit Japanese kanji characters. With the help of Kazuhiko Nishi, leader of ASCII Microsoft, Microsoft arrived early in Japan.
1983	October	The Philips/Sony "Yellow Book" sets rules for storing data on CD-ROM, but omits mention of any logical structure for files and directories.
1983	November	The IBM PCjr is announced. It had half-height 5 1/4-inch disk drives and ran PC DOS 2.1. which supported PCjr's ability to run programs from ROM cartridges and slightly different disk controller architecture. Its built-in CGA-compatible display adapter added three special graphics modes which would not be supported by later generation adapters. International modifications in MS-DOS 2.01 were not included because IBM did not want them. PCjr ships first quarter 1984 in limited supply.
1983	November	Microsoft Word ships. On the suggestion of Rowland Hanson, who also convinced Gates to change the name "Interface Manager" to "Windows", the Multi-Tool name was killed. PC World bound an envelope containing a Word demonstration disk inside its pages.
1983	November	Borland is launched by a single full-page ad for Turbo Pascal in Byte magazine. Lacking money to pay for the ad, the company deceives Byte's salesman into running the ad on credit, by hiring extra people so Borland would look like a busy, venture-backed company, making sure the phones were ringing and the extras were scurrying around. Borland expected to sell maybe $20,000 worth of software and at least pay for the ad—they sold $150,000 worth. Without subterfuge, Borland International would almost certainly have folded.
1983	November	Less than two weeks after VisiCorp announced the release of Visi On (see below), in New York on November 10, Microsoft officially announced Windows as "a graphical user interface to cover DOS." Gates said that with Windows, users would finally be able to use their software on any PC without compatibility issues.
1983	December	Visi On, the first graphical user interface-based operating environment for the PC—generally viewed as VisiCorp's answer to Apple's Lisa—ships. It runs on top of DOS 2.0 and requires at least 512 KB RAM and a 5 MB hard drive, a Mouse Systems-compatible mouse and CGA. It does not make use of color—it uses black-and-white graphics at 640×200 resolution. Although it was highly hyped in 1982 and 1983, Visi On never caught on—it was painfully slow and overpriced ($1765 with the mouse, a spreadsheet similar to VisiCalc, and word-processing and graphics programs). Few users had mice and hard disks, and many balked at paying $2500 or more to add them to their computers.
1984	January	Clone competition heated up in the past two months, with new microcomputers from Leading Edge, Panasonic, Tandy, Sperry, North Star, Gavilan and others. A similar spate of IBM clones existed during IBM mainframes' late 1960s/early 1970s heyday, when many companies developed plug compatible computers. IBM improved its models and changed specifications so the clones were no longer compatible, and many plug compatible mainframe manufacturers went bankrupt. Suspicious that history could repeat, many recent microcomputer entrants are proud of their technological advances earned at the cost of compatibility, such as portability, faster performance, better graphics, increased memory or a simpler user interface than the IBM PC or PC/XT.
1984	January	The Macintosh 128K, a milestone computer designed around a graphical user interface, is introduced. It would be several years before the PC platform had graphics as a standard feature, and not until 1990 would PC graphics "really work".
1984	February	Digital Research ships Concurrent CP/M Release 3.1, featuring PC-Mode, which allows users to run either PC DOS or CP/M-86 applications.
1984	March	Microsoft combined versions 2.1 and 2.01 to create MS-DOS 2.11 for other OEMs. Version 2.11 was sold worldwide and translated into about 10 different languages. It was shipped by every major OEM, including Hewlett-Packard, Wang, DEC, Texas Instruments, Compaq, and Tandy. By June, Microsoft will have licensed MS-DOS to 200 manufacturers.
1984	May	Quarterdeck Office Systems ships their Desq text-mode operating environment (list price $399) which runs on top of DOS 2.0. Desq allows nine windows to be open at the same time, on either a color or monochrome display. However, concurrent processing (multitasking) isn't supported. Unlike Visi On, it doesn't require developers to configure their programs to operate inside its windows. A mouse is optional—the Microsoft, Mouse Systems and Logitech mouse types with either two or three buttons are supported. Desq got off to a slow start, with like products from better known developers still on the horizon.
1984	May	Accepting the emergence of PC DOS as a de facto standard, Digital Research announced Concurrent PC DOS, which allows users to run up to four programs simultaneously using PC DOS and/or CP/M. Concurrent PC DOS supports up to four windows and requires 256 KB RAM, with 512 KB recommended. It can support two users, with one attaching a dumb terminal to the micro's serial port. Concurrent PC DOS, due out by the end of 1984, will be offered for the AT&T 6300. However, the PC mode is not perfectly compatible. It may have trouble with programs that bypass the operating system to address specific memory locations, and is only DOS 1.1 compatible, so it can't read beyond 2.0's root directories. PC expert Peter Norton thinks multitasking and multiuser abilities are more than the PC was meant to handle.
1984	May	Phoenix Software Associates introduces the first Phoenix PC ROM-BIOS which enabled OEMs to build essentially 100%-compatible clones without having to reverse-engineer the IBM PC BIOS themselves, as Compaq had done for the Portable, helping fuel the growth in the PC compatibles industry and sales of non-IBM versions of MS-DOS. Phoenix said it used a "TI-9900 programmer" to reverse-engineer IBM's BIOS, and its ads touted an insurance policy against copyright-infringement suits. IBM had sued companies that simply copied the code.
1984	June	Borland runs a two-page ad in Byte for Sidekick, a memory-resident, or terminate-and-stay-resident (TSR) program that uses a hot-key pop-up window to superimpose a calculator, calendar, notepad, phone dialer, and ASCII table onto PC DOS software. Other companies soon discovered this wonderful DOS feature and TSRs began competing for the PC compatible's finite memory space. InfoWorld would name it 1984 Software Product of the Year (1-2-3 was their 1983 awardee).
1984	August	Microsoft releases MS-DOS 3.0, (Note: Some OEMs (in Europe) labeled this version MS-DOS 3.05) after a difficult year and a half of grappling with problems of software incompatibility, remote file management, and logical device independence at the network level. In laying the foundation for networking, the core team of five people led by Zbikowski and Reynolds redesigned and rewrote the DOS kernel. Redirector and sharer interfaces for IBM's network adapter card were added, but the redirector itself, which interacts with the transport layer of the network, wasn't ready. Per Zbikowski: "The product was not ready for us to ship when IBM said, 'Fine, we'll take it.'"
1984	August	The IBM PC/AT, a computer built around the 6-MHz Intel 80286 microprocessor, with a 16-bit AT bus, new CMOS clock and 20 MB hard drive, is introduced. It ships with PC DOS 3.0, which adds support for quadruple, or high density (80-track), 15 sectors per track 1.2 MB (1,228,800 bytes; 2,400 sectors) floppy disks. Their FAT fills seven sectors (14 for two copies) and root directory 14 (holding up to 224 entries), leaving 2,371 1-sector clusters (1,213,952 bytes) for data. The hard disk has 614 cylinders, four sides, and 17 sectors/track, a total of 41,752 sectors or 21,377,024 bytes raw space. The 12-bit FAT design allows for a maximum of 4,078 clusters. DOS cluster sizes are powers of two, so to avoid using 16-sector clusters and support larger hard disks more efficiently, DOS added a new partition type (0x04) for partitions larger than 15 MB, using a 16-bit FAT, which allows a smaller 4-sector cluster size. As a result, DOS 2.x hard disks larger than 15 MB, which used a 12-bit FAT (type 0x01) are incompatible with later versions of DOS. The 286 has a 24-bit address bus that can address 16 MB of RAM, and IBM officially supported expansion to 3 MB. PC DOS 3.0 supported use of extended memory with the VDISK.SYS installable device driver, which allowed configuration of one or more virtual disks (RAM disks). The /E switch caused virtual disks to use extended memory rather than conventional memory. VDISK used a BIOS memory transfer service, termed the Interrupt 15h interface, to avoid switching directly into protected virtual address mode. However, the ROM-BIOS routine did switch from real mode to protected mode and back again, a relatively slow process which was not reliable for some applications. PC DOS 3.0 also provided the same international support included earlier in version 2.11. IBM also announced a PC/AT version of the Xenix multiuser operating system, the IBM PC Network (developed for IBM by Sytek and supported by PC DOS 3.1), and a new multitasking windowing software utility called TopView—all will be available in first quarter 1985. The redesigned keyboard added an 84th key. IBM's software engineers were tasked with making it switch the AT from DOS into a "virtual machine" or "hypervisor" mode that would enable multitasking programs written for different operating systems. The motherboard grew in size to fit in the added circuits such as the clock and the second Intel 8259 & 8237 controllers.
1984	September	IBM introduces the Enhanced Graphics Adapter (EGA), which costs $524 and has 16 KB ROM and 64 KB RAM. A further 64 KB RAM ($199) comes on a piggyback board called the Graphics Memory Expansion Card. A further 128 KB ($259) added to the piggyback board produces a fully loaded 256 KB EGA card (total cost: $982). For use with monochrome monitors, the EGA supports MDA-text mode and adds a 640×350 monochrome graphics mode, a slightly lower resolution than the Hercules' 720×348. The EGA has the advantage of being "IBM standard" with built-in BIOS support, while Hercules has the initial advantage of being more widely used and software-supported. For color monitors, all seven CGA modes are supported. 80-column text mode resolution improved from the CGA's 640×200 to 640×350—shy of the 720×350 resolution achieved by Compaq. Three new graphics modes were added, including 16 colors simultaneously from a palette of 64 colors at 640×350 resolution (see EGA palettes). The IBM 5154 enhanced color monitor ($849, planned availability January 1985) is needed to display the increased resolution. IBM also announces the 640×480, 256-color Professional Graphics Controller (PGC) for computer-aided design (CAD) workstations. The PGC has IBM's first graphics coprocessor and is its first video controller to produce an analog signal.
1984	November	In Europe, AT&T and Microsoft release MS-DOS 3.1, (Note: Some European OEMs labeled this version MS-DOS 3.06) which added a new local area network supplement Microsoft Networks 1.0 (identified earlier as MS-Net) for use on non-IBM network cards. Microsoft Networks services are provided by a file server which is part of the Networks application and runs on a computer dedicated to the task. Neither MS-Net, nor its successor LAN Manager, was particularly successful competing against market leader Novell, whose product Novell NetWare had a seventy percent market share.
1984	December	Qualitas announces TallScreen, a utility that lets you scroll up the screen to see text that's scrolled off the top of the display, and Rational Systems announces Instant-C, a C language interpreter. These two small businesses would become better known for their memory manager and DOS extender products introduced in July 1987.
1985	January	Digital Research previews Concurrent DOS 286 in cooperation with Intel. The product functions strictly as an 80286 native mode operating system, allowing users to exploit the protected mode fully to perform multi-user, multitasking operations while running 8086 emulation.
1985	March	IBM ships their TopView text-mode operating environment. A June InfoWorld product review called it slow and memory hungry, and said it required users to know too many technical details about their programs.
1985	April	The IBM PC Network program, supporting IBM's network adapter card, is released. It runs on PC DOS 3.1.
1985	April	At the Spring COMDEX, Intel announces a memory board called Above Board that circumvents the 640 KB memory barrier, and Lotus Development Corp. announces new versions of Lotus 1-2-3 and Symphony intended to make use of the newly available memory. Above Board uses bank switching so the IBM PC and PC/AT can use what Intel and Lotus call the expanded memory device interface specification 3.0 (EMS, not to be confused with IBM's extended memory). The specification allows use of up to 8 MB of RAM. Above Board packs up to 2 MB, and two Above Boards can coexist in the same system. A source estimated that 4 MB of RAM would yield about 500,000 cells in a spreadsheet. EMS is implemented with the expanded memory manager (EMM), a device driver supplied by the board manufacturer as a CONFIG.SYS DEVICE directive. The specification was publicly released to product developers, and similar memory boards were soon released by others including Tecmar and Quadram. Many of the first programs supporting EMS assumed that all available EMS memory was for them, resulting in "EMS wars" as disk caching software, resident programs and applications stomped over each other's use of expanded memory. Only by embracing the spec could peace reign and multiple programs safely share and simultaneously use expanded memory.
1985	April	At Compaq's annual shareholders' meeting, after the Pointer Sisters sing their hit song "I'm So Excited" on the mock-keyboard stage floor, CEO Rod Canion introduces the Deskpro 286 and Portable 286. They used the second version of the 80286 which ran at an 8 Mhz clock rate, 33% faster than IBM's AT. Compaq helped Intel find and fix compatibility bugs in their first 80286. While a significant number of PC and XT programs wouldn't run correctly on the AT, Compaq's 286 machines ran all "industry standard" software written for the IBM PC, XT, and AT. Compaq separated themselves from IBM by using the more official-sounding term "industry standard architecture" instead of "IBM compatible", creating the acroynym ISA.
1985	May	Microsoft is "just now shipping" DOS 3.1 in the US; PC users complain that availability is limited. The major LAN players have announced their support, e.g. 3Com's LAN will incorporate a portion of Microsoft's Redirector.
1985	May	Seven months after its introduction, the EGA has not displaced IBM's first generation of video boards because most developers have yet to adapt their software to it. Among the handful of software packages now fully supporting the EGA is Digital Research's GEM (Graphics Environment Manager). For a number of reasons, software designed for the CGA's graphics mode won't work properly under the EGA's emulation mode, but software designed for the MDA generally does.
1985	May	Digital Research exposed problems with the emulation features on the C-1 step of Intel's 80286 chip which would not allow Concurrent DOS 286 to run 8086 software in the protected mode. The release of Concurrent DOS 286 was delayed until Intel develops a new version of the chip. Industry observers are by no means certain that Concurrent DOS 286 will ever be able to run existing software effectively in protected mode, even with Intel's refinements to the chip.
1985	June	Digital Research releases Concurrent DOS 86 Version 4.1, an updated version of Concurrent DOS that supports high-end IBM-compatibles, MS-DOS 2.1 applications and Digital Research's GEM software.
1985	June	AST Research announces the RAMpage multifunction board, designed as a superset of the Lotus-Intel standard, to operate in a multitasking environment on the PC.
1985	June	Atari shows a prototype CD-ROM at the Summer Consumer Electronics Show in Chicago, hooked to an Atari 520ST, running a 58-million character encyclopedia. Software for the CD-ROM is being developed by Activenture, a company founded by Kildall.
1985	July	Quarterdeck ships DESQview. Facing bankruptcy after IBM's TopView announcement "stopped" sales, they rewrote Desq to be TopView-compatible.
1985	July	Microsoft says it is joining forces with Lotus and Intel in support of the EMS, which will now be named the Lotus-Intel-Microsoft Specification. Microsoft plans to integrate expanded memory abilities into its future systems software products. Together with the announcement, Intel released a new version 3.2 of the specification. Intel said that enhancements in the revision allow multitasking operating systems to support more easily multiple application programs sharing expanded memory. Application programs communicate directly with the EMM using a software interrupt, bypassing DOS. A new EMM function supported multitasking operating systems by saving and restoring page maps.
1985	August	IBM and Microsoft announce a long-term joint development agreement to share specified DOS code and create a new multitasking operating system from scratch, known by various code names: CP-DOS, 286DOS, DOS 5, New DOS, or Advanced DOS (OS/2 would eventually be released in late 1987). The pact was signed in June.
1985	August	Don Estridge, who led development of the original IBM Personal Computer, and opened its specifications (the "father of the IBM PC"), dies in the crash of Delta Air Lines Flight 191.
1985	August	Microsoft announces its first LAN-compatible application, Microsoft Word for Networks. The program is stored on the network file server.
1985	August	Market reaction to IBM's Enhanced Graphics Adapter has not been overwhelming, partly because the EGA's complexity—five custom chips and 12 modes—has slowed software development and the board's price tag has been a damper for many, but the EGA is emerging as the next graphics standard. Lotus expects to release drivers supporting 1-2-3 and Symphony by the end of the month, and Microsoft Chart will join Word and Windows in supporting the EGA. Several clone boards are expected to hit the market over the next six months. Chips and Technologies (C&T) is creating a full, custom EGA chip set. IBM tried to insulate developers from the board and sidestep the driver problem by incorporating the Virtual Device Interface (VDI) from Graphic Software Systems (GSS) of Wilsonville, Oregon (founded in 1981 by four former Tektronix engineers) into the EGA, but many developers are choosing to ignore the IBM VDI. Digital Research has its own Virtual Device Interface, which they describe as similar to a superset of IBM's VDI, which they say has limited raster graphics support. A number of vendors are writing directly to the screen rather than the VDI to get better performance, including Lotus and Ashton-Tate. Microsoft's upcoming Windows uses Microsoft's Graphics Device Interface, a superset of Graphic Software Systems' VDI. Ashton-Tate's development director said that because the EGA slows down the 8088, creating performance problems, the EGA's technical benefits almost require the 80286. A Microsoft software engineer said the basic 64 KB EGA forces a trade-off between resolution and color—a user can have either 4-color 640×350 or 16-color 640×200 resolution, recommending the 64 KB piggyback board for good performance of 16 colors at 640×350 resolution. Historically, graphics has been viewed as a vertical market—charting or computer-aided design. Graphics is moving from niche markets to an overall system technology incorporated in almost every type of application with the development of user interface technology.
1985	August	After four weeks of testing E-step samples of the 80286, Digital Research acknowledged that Intel corrected all documented 286 errata, but said there were still undocumented chip performance problems with the prerelease version of Concurrent DOS 286 running on the E-step. Intel said the approach Digital Research wished to take in emulating 8086 software in protected mode differed from the original specifications. Intel will make minor changes in the microcode that will allow Digital Research to run emulation mode much faster, incorporated into the E-2 step.
1985	September	Digital Research sidelines Concurrent DOS 4.1 into DOS Plus 1.x. The Philips :YES, a DOS Plus equipped Intel 80186-based computer to be produced and marketed in Austria, is announced.
1985	September	C&T announces its EGA CHIPSet, a set of four VLSI chips enabling cheaper graphics cards than IBM's $982 EGA, which improved on its speed and performance and made the EGA widely accepted as a standard. By November's COMDEX over a half-dozen companies introduce EGA-compatible cards priced at about $600.
1985	October	Microsoft releases MS-DOS 2.25, which added support for Korean Hangul characters. Many of the system utilities were made compatible with MS-DOS 3.0. This version was distributed in the Far East but was never shipped by OEMs in the United States and Europe.
1985	October	Intel announces the 32-bit Intel 80386. The 386 has a 32-bit address bus that can directly address 2^{32} (4,294,967,296) memory locations, i.e. 4096 MB or 4 gigabytes (GB) of RAM using the flat memory model, or up to 2^{46} bytes (64 terabytes) of virtual memory. To sustain the 386's 33 MHz maximum clock rate, a cache memory system containing fast SRAMs connected over the microprocessor's local bus is used.
1985	November	InfoWorld reported that business users were displaying a nearly insatiable demand for more disk storage capacity. A company was selling a disk system for the PC/AT that could hold 240 megabytes in one file, and many 40- and 80-megabyte disks were in use. However, there was a problem. DOS limited partitions to only 32 MB—the BPB's Total Sectors on the Volume field limit was 65,536 (2^{16}), and 16-bit addresses passed to interrupts 25h and 26h. Many were surprised that IBM did not demolish the 32 MB barrier with PC DOS 3.0 or 3.1. The most common way to resolve this problem was to treat large drives as if they were actually two or more drives. The drives are then termed logical or volume drives, and work well as long as no one file is larger than 32 MB.
1985	November	Digital Research, in an effort to promote its stalled Concurrent PC DOS operating system, modified the system to exploit the RAMpage expanded memory specification. Concurrent PC DOS XM was scheduled to be released in first quarter 1986, followed by a second quarter update compatible with PC DOS 3.1's record and file locking scheme and file sharing schemes. Both the Lotus-Intel-Microsoft and AST expanded memory specifications enable users to address up to 8 MB of RAM.
1985	November	C&T ships its first AT-compatible chipset, five chips that replace 63 motherboard components, making it a hardware equivalent of the Phoenix BIOS. Phoenix is working on an AT-compatible design that uses the C&T chipset, and a design that integrates graphics onto the motherboard. The CHIPSet design allows the motherboard size and power consumption to be reduced, so that an AT-compatible motherboard can be used in an XT chassis. This chipset will be included in the Tandy 3000 and the AT-compatible from PC's Limited.
1985	November	At a COMDEX roast, Gates is presented with a vaporware award, as the "two-years late" multitasking operating environment Windows 1.0 is introduced. PC Magazine says its best features aren't multitasking and windowing, but rather its ability to turn ordinary applications into memory-resident utilities, and, for developers, its Graphics Device Interface.
1985	November	Near Lake Tahoe, an ad hoc committee of vendors meets at the High Sierra Hotel and Casino to develop a standard logical format for organizing data on CD-ROM.
1985	December	The European Computer Manufacturers Association adopts and releases standard ECMA-107, Volume and File Structure of Flexible Disk Cartridges for Information Interchange, standardizing FAT12.
1986	January	Microsoft releases MS-DOS 3.2 to IBM.
1986	January	Grolier and Activenture ship a CD-ROM-based encyclopedia, Philips CD-ROM drive and PC-compatible interface board for $1,495. Atari, seeking a lower cost CD-ROM unit, delayed its product.
1986	January	InfoWorld reported that during the past year a growing number of generic, no-name PC compatibles gained support as legitimate alternatives to major manufacturers' systems. Components of clones have become such standard commodities that most feel that the generic machines achieve a high degree of compatibility. Although some dealers include a copy of MS-DOS with their generic micros, many small dealers do not. Usually users can buy copies of IBM's PC DOS from authorized IBM dealers.
1986	January	IBM announces its reduced instruction set computer (RISC), the IBM RT PC, with a 40 MB hard drive and a physical appearance virtually identical to the PC/AT. PC DOS programs will run on RT PCs with an optional board containing an 80286 processor and a coprocessor program allowing users to switch between AIX and PC DOS operations.
1986	February	Digital Research and IBM agreed to use Concurrent DOS 286 in versions of the PC/AT for point of sale in retail stores and other vertical applications. Concurrent DOS 286 will serve as the basis for IBM's 4680 operating system. Numerous IBM value-added resellers with medical, legal and other vertical application packages have shown interest in the product.
1986	February	DESQview 1.2 ships. It supports AST's enhanced expanded memory specification (EEMS) on the new RAMpage (stylized RAMpage!) board. The only other major program using AST's superset is Ashton-Tate's Framework II. Computerworld said it used less memory than Windows or TopView and may be the "most pragmatic choice".
1986	March	NEC announces its MultiSync monitor in magazine ads. Compatible with the CGA, EGA and PGC, it supports resolutions up to 800×560 and offers analog input.
1986	March	In Seattle, Kildall gives the keynote address at Microsoft's First International Conference on CD-ROM, where the High Sierra Group released its set of proposals.
1986	March	IBM released the first components of its Token Ring local area network, and PC DOS 3.2, which supports token ring operations. Although it adds support for 3 1/2-inch double-density 720 KB floppy disk drives (IBM did not say why), it will be released on a 5 1/4-inch floppy. The Token Ring Network allows IBM PC users to share printers, files, and other devices. Supporting software includes the IBM Token Ring/PC Network Interconnect Program and the advanced program-to-program communications for the IBM PC (APP/PC). Some dealers carrying IBM's earlier networking product, the IBM PC Network, are waiting to gauge demand for the Token Ring Network before carrying the product.
1986	March	Microsoft is expected to release MS-DOS 3.2 to compatible manufacturers, with the same features as PC DOS 3.2. A new device driver RAMDRIVE.SYS creates a virtual disk in either conventional memory, extended memory or Lotus-Intel-Microsoft expanded memory. However, the MS-DOS kernel does not take part in expanded memory manipulations and does not use expanded memory for its own purposes. RAMDRIVE.SYS reportedly uses the undocumented LOADALL CPU instructions, which permit a real-mode program to access any location in extended memory. Presumably this allows RAMDRIVE.SYS to improve upon IBM's relatively slow and unreliable VDISK process. This is the first MS-DOS version Microsoft offered in a shrink wrap packaged product for smaller OEMs or system builders.
1986	March	Apricot Computers pre-announces MS-DOS 4.0, the first multitasking version. Apricot will sell MS-DOS 4.0 to European customers as the controlling program for network servers that support a new family of Apricot microcomputers. Apricot will also offer MS-Net 2, a new version of Microsoft's LAN. Developers and industry insiders expect Microsoft to bypass that version in the United States in favor of a more powerful version, MS-DOS 5.0, which will access up to 16 MB of RAM.
1986	April	IBM announced the Expanded Memory Adapter (XMA) for the 3270 PC, which enables users to have multiple DOS sessions and a host session, or multiple host sessions and one DOS session. The XMA is not compatible with the Lotus-Intel-Microsoft specification, but uses a bank-switching technique that closely resembles AST's EEMS. IBM also announced TopView 1.10 and the 80C88-based IBM PC Convertible, IBM's first computer to use 3 1/2-inch floppy disks, which will be available in May. The PC Convertible uses application-specific integrated circuit (ASIC) chips which combine the functions of numerous chips into fewer, more specialized chips, foreshadowing IBM's strategy to use proprietary architecture in future machines. IBM also announced a faster 8-MHz version of the PC/AT and a new 101- (U.S.) / 102-key (Europe) Enhanced Keyboard. IBM's Entry Systems Division president warned that competitors will have to "move very quickly in order to remain compatible."
1986	April	Six months after the EEMS specification was introduced and AST and Quarterdeck joined forces to support its use in DESQview, Quadram announced that their new Quad EMS+ board would support it.
1986	May	While software makers debate a standard for memory-resident programs, two developers are racing to develop utilities that promise to help normally incompatible TSRs work together. The programs are Referee from Persoft Inc. and Borland's MOM (Memory Organization Manager). Ultimately, users would rebel because they couldn't keep track of all the special conditions for each TSR. Many TSRs failed as products because dealing with the complexity was more trouble than the value delivered.
1986	June	At the National Computer Conference, the High Sierra Group announced its logical file format standards defining a volume table of contents and directory structure for CD-ROM.
1986	August	PC's Limited is selling an EGA-compatible board (that uses Chips and Technologies chips) for $269. PC Magazine reports on two build-your-own-AT alternatives: from a kit, or individually purchased components. They found that few of the many companies offering AT motherboards were willing to sell just one.
1986	August	IBM's retail PC market share slipped by 10 percent in the last year, and now accounts for less than half the PC-compatibles sold. For many, there seems to be no compelling reason to buy IBM anymore. In June, chief executive John F. Akers told analysts IBM would consider withdrawing from part of the PC market if it became too commodity-like.
1986	September	Compaq introduces the first Intel 80386-based computer, the Compaq Deskpro 386. It was the most powerful personal computer on the market. IBM had not yet ordered a single 386 chip from Intel. Rod Canion warned that if IBM doesn't respond with its own 80386-based machine within six months, the Deskpro 386 will become the industry's 32-bit personal computer standard. Two models were announced, Model 40 (40 MB hard drive) and Model 130 (130 MB). Both came with built-in support for up to 8 MB of expanded memory, by using the Compaq Expanded Memory Manager (CEMM)—the first so-called PC "memory manager" for 80386 CPUs—to emulate expanded memory. The Deskpro 386 system memory board was expandable to 10 MB, but no operating system was yet available to exploit more than the 1 MB address space of the original IBM PC (except by creating RAM disks and disk caches; Compaq utilities VDISK.SYS and CACHE.EXE did this). Compaq called their solution to the 32 MB partition limit enhanced disk, which was implemented with a custom Compaq version of FDISK that allowed creation of multiple MS-DOS partitions on a single hard drive, and the ENHDISK.SYS device driver installed into CONFIG.SYS to access those extra partitions. Model 130's enhanced disk could hold four 32 MB partitions.
1986	September	Chips and Technologies announces the 82C206 – a single chip that integrates all the main motherboard functions, replacing seven Intel chips – the clock generator, bus controller, system timer, two 8259 controllers, and two 8237 controllers – and the Motorola CMOS/clock chip. Combining this new chip with the existing five-chip set enables PC clone makers to greatly reduce the size, complexity and cost of their machines, while increasing their speed.
1986	September	Microsoft announced OEM extensions to MS-DOS that will allow any computer running DOS 3.1 or 3.2 to read data from any CD-ROM formatted in High Sierra Format.
1986	September	Microsoft demonstrates MS-DOS 4.0 and MS-Net 2.0 at a Paris trade show. They will be released simultaneously in the fourth quarter this year. Apricot and SMT Goupil both plan to support the new software. Microsoft president Jon Shirley said at least one contract is pending with a U.S. manufacturer. He said that MS-DOS 4.0 "doesn't move forward with the 286"—it does not replace Xenix or offer a completely multiuser DOS. It is intended for networks in which every workstation can process requests as a high-performance, non-dedicated file server with high level communications that need to do preemptive multitasking.
1986	October	DESQview 1.3 is announced. It supports the virtual 8086 mode of the 80386, but only on Compaq's Deskpro 386, by using CEMM. Quarterdeck calls it the first "control program" or "virtual machine manager" for 386-based machines—it runs up to nine applications simultaneously in up to 640 KB of memory each, supporting applications using EMS memory, even though that isn't an inherent feature of virtual 8086 mode. Control programs are the first step toward operating environments that exploit the 386 fully.
1986	October	Microsoft ships MS-DOS 4.0 to Wang, ICL, and virtually nobody else. Essentially it was Windows minus the graphical user interface (see New Executable). Microsoft, having long tried to kill it as redundant, honored its contractual commitments.
1986	November	Phar Lap Software introduces the first DOS extender, 386|DOS-Extender, a software developer's tool that allows 32-bit mainframe-size application programs to run under MS-DOS 3.1 or 3.2 on any 80386-based IBM PC-compatible computer by exploiting the 80386's protected-mode memory abilities.
1986	November	The Software Link demonstrated PC-MOS/386 at COMDEX. Release of the multiuser operating system that supports the 80386 virtual and protected modes is scheduled for February 1987.
1986	December	The European Computer Manufacturers Association adopts and releases standard ECMA-119, Volume and File Structure of CDROM for Information Interchange, a re-edited version of the High Sierra Group proposal, and submits it to ISO for further processing as an international standard.
1987	January	Digital Research's new Flexible Automation Business Unit introduced its first product, the real-time operating system FlexOS 286, a re-engineered version of Concurrent DOS 286 designed specifically for computer-integrated manufacturing.
1987	January	IBM ships a patch disk for PC DOS 3.2 that amends five command files and includes two keyboard programs for the IBM Enhanced Keyboard.
1987	February	Quarterdeck recently released Quarterdeck Expanded Memory Manager 386 (QEMM).
1987	February	Digital Research launches Concurrent DOS 386, which runs up to four applications concurrently supporting up to 10 users on a system.
1987	March	The March 20 The Wall Street Journal says that 31-year-old Gates has become the youngest self-made billionaire in history.
1987	April	The IBM Personal System/2 line is released. Models range from the 8086-based IBM PS/2 Model 30, with 256-color Multi-Color Graphics Array (MCGA) to the 80386-based Model 80, with 256 KB RAM 640×480, 16-color Video Graphics Array (VGA). The default VGA text mode renders nine-by-16 pixel character cells (720×400 resolution), a higher resolution than MDA. MCGA and VGA produce an analog signal; their predecessors, except the high-end PGC, produced a digital TTL signal. MCGA and VGA are integrated into the motherboard, rather than added on an expansion card, but IBM says a PS/2 VGA adapter for upgrading Model 30 and older PCs will be available in July. The PS/2 line runs on PC DOS 3.3 (the new protected mode multitasking Operating System/2 is announced for availability in first quarter 1988). Version 3.3 added support for high density 3 1/2-inch 1.44 MB floppy disk drives, which IBM introduced in its 80286-based and higher PS/2 models, and introduced a partition type (0x05) for extended partitions, which could hold up to 23 logical drives. The Micro Channel architecture (MCA) bus is introduced—Models 50 and 60 use a 16-bit version, while Model 80 uses a version that supports 32-bit data and addressing. The upgrade from DOS 3.2 to 3.3 was completely written by IBM, with no development effort on the part of Microsoft, who were working on "Advanced DOS 1.0". Soon after release, some users with non-IBM hardware reported hard drive problems. The MS-DOS version of 3.3 was still being tested by Microsoft. The DIN connector used by earlier PC keyboards is replaced by a mini-DIN connector, and mice get the same connector; these "PS/2 connectors" would become the new standard for PC-compatibles.
1987	April	A Microsoft press release announces Windows 2.0, which has "visual fidelity" to the Microsoft Operating System/2 Windows Presentation Manager, for shipment in the third quarter.
1987	April	Fox Software announced Foxbase 2.0 386, the first database to exploit the 386's memory fully, by using the Phar Lap DOS extender program, which intercepts calls to DOS and automatically switches the system back to real mode for those functions. By tapping the chip's protected mode, the entire program can run in memory, eliminating disk access times and improving execution speed in some cases by a factor of 10. The program does not support multitasking, which must wait for advances in the operating system, so it is an interim solution.
1987	May	DESQview 2.0 ships. When used with QEMM, it supports virtual 8086 mode. It supports the EGA's 43-line text mode, and the VGA's 50- and 60-line modes. Also, TopView's program information file (.PIF) format and it comes with a TopView 1.1-compatible API.
1987	June	IBM delivers the IBM 8514/A display adapter, an optional upgrade for PS/2 models 50, 60, and 80 which is essentially a superset of VGA that works together with the on-board VGA processor. Like the PGC, it has a graphics coprocessor, which processes vector graphics, whereas CGA, EGA, and framebuffer VGA use raster graphics and rely on the main CPU for most video processing. Its 1,024×768 resolution produces interlaced video, which tends to flicker.
1987	June	Phar Lap and Quarterdeck announce a joint development agreement to support 386|DOS-Extender under DESQview.
1987	July	Fox Software ships Foxbase 2.0 386. Phar Lap admits its DOS extender conflicts with TSR programs as well as Novell NetWare. Fox found Intelligent Graphics Corp.'s X-AM currently more reliable, and built an X-AM run-time version into Foxbase 2.0 386. The key to X-AM's performance is apparently its ability to switch from protected 386 mode to virtual 8086 mode.
1987	July	Rational Systems releases their DOS/16M 16-bit DOS extender, a library for C and MASM programmers who don't want to wait for OS/2 to produce large programs, that lets linked programs use up to 16 MB of RAM with DOS 3.x on 286- and 386-based systems. Users don't have to convert to another operating system or contend with such time-consuming tricks as code overlays, bank switching and paging.
1987	July	Qualitas 386 to the Max is introduced. InfoWorld says it outperforms, has more features, and takes less memory than all other memory managers. It would be widely used with Windows/286 at Microsoft, as customers everywhere praised its speed and versatility over Windows/386.
1987	August	Compaq files a U.S. patent application for "software emulation of bank-switched memory using a virtual DOS monitor and paged memory management." Their invention uses 80386 paging hardware and virtual 8086 mode to emulate expanded memory using extended memory. The patent would be issued in 1990.
1987	August	Microsoft ships MS-DOS 3.3. It has the same feature set as the version IBM has been shipping since April.
1987	August	Lotus-Intel-Microsoft EMS 4.0 is announced. Key features include the ability to execute program code from expanded memory, including memory-resident programs; boosting the expanded memory ceiling from 8 to 32 megabytes; and the ability for multiple programs to use expanded memory at once. Quarterdeck introduced an update of QEMM supporting EMS 4.0. The new EMS is designed to eliminate "RAM cram," the overstuffing of conventional memory with TSR programs.
1987	September	Microsoft announces Windows/386, version 2.0. Compaq, co-developer of the product, will bundle it with its 386-based systems, starting in October.
1987	October	ICL releases their OEM MS-DOS 4.1, a customized version that enabled users to run one application in foreground and an unlimited number of applications in background mode. It runs on an ISDN workstation.
1987	October	STB Systems releases the first BIOS-level compatible VGA board, soon followed by Sigma Designs. Register-level compatible boards soon followed. Unlike MCA, VGA was quickly accepted in the video board industry as the new standard. While IBM's PS/2 VGA adapter only has an analog port, third-party VGA-compatible cards have both an analog 15-pin port and a digital nine-pin port for compatibility with prior hardware.
1987	October	Microsoft announces and ships the first PC version of its Excel spreadsheet. Excel for Microsoft Windows requires Windows and includes Windows 2.01 in run-time. Excel runs on 286- and 386-based systems with an accelerator board. Excel offers Dynamic Data Exchange, a Windows feature. Excel reads and writes 1-2-3 files and accepts 1-2-3 macros.
1987	November	Compaq ships Compaq MS-DOS 3.31 with support for hard disk partitions over 32 MB, up to 512 MB. Partitions over 32 MB use a new partition type (0x06). Compaq dropped support for creating enhanced disks from their version of FDISK, while maintaining support for ENHDISK partitions created by prior versions.
1987	November	Intelligent Graphics Corporation (IGC) announces its VM/386 control program, which provides access to multitasking and virtual memory. The program, inspired by IBM's VM/370 operating system, creates full-screen "virtual machines". Control-Alt-Delete reboots the current virtual machine within VM/386 without resetting the host system. The SysRq key brings up the VM manager. IGC's DOS extender, X-AM, will be supported in a future version of VM/386.
1987	November	Quarterdeck announces a new version of DESQview which runs applications that use 386|DOS-Extender, such as Paradox 386–that's set to ship next month. New versions of QEMM and 386|DOS-Extender ship in first quarter 1988.
1987	December	IBM ships OS/2 Standard Edition, Version 1.0 early.
1987	December	Zenith became the first vendor to ship Microsoft OS/2. Most vendors decided not to bundle OS/2 with their PCs, and are only offering it as an option.
1987	December	ECMA adopts the 2nd edition of standard ECMA-119, Volume and File Structure of CDROM for Information Interchange, introducing some improvements and editorial amendments. This edition is technically identical with ISO 9660.
1988	January	Windows 2.03 and Windows/386 finally hit retail outlets. Windows can overlap – version 1.0 windows only tiled. Program information files (PIFs) are used for launching applications, as with TopView and DESQview.
1988	March	At its Third International Conference on CD-ROM, Microsoft introduced version 2.0 of the MSCDEX CD ROM Extensions, adding support for the ISO 9660 standard.
1988	May	Digital Research releases DR DOS 3.31, supporting hard disk partitions up to 512 MB. DR DOS is ROMable, unlike MS-DOS.
1988	June	Microsoft releases Windows/286, version 2.1, which replaces Windows 2.03. It provides an extra 50 KB above the 640 KB DOS limit, when running on a system with more than 1 MB of extended memory available. A future version, as well as the next EMS, will add 64 KB rather than 50 KB to main memory. Windows/286 still runs on 8086/8088-based systems, but without this new memory. Windows/386, version 2.1 was also released.
1988	July	IBM ships IBM DOS 4.0. It adds an optional text-based file manager shell (DOSSHELL) with pull-down menus called by typing the F10 key, optional mouse support and a text-based user interface—an alternative to the command-line interface—which is a subset of the upcoming OS/2 version 1.1's Presentation Manager. The DOS Shell could run in either text mode or graphics mode (on supported hardware), depending on how it was configured in the file DOSSHELL.BAT. Text mode is required to avoid incompatibilities (video conflicts) while running many popular TSR programs in graphics mode. IBM DOS 4.0 supports Lotus-Intel-Microsoft EMS 4.0 on IBM's Expanded Memory Adapter, and is the first MS-DOS/PC DOS version that is "EMS-aware" and can use the EMS memory when it is available. DOS 4 supports hard disk partitions over 32 MB, up to 1024 MB. It also offers a hard drive installation program as an alternative to the procedure used in prior versions (FDISK, FORMAT, SYS, COPY), enhanced video-graphics support and improved error handling. The release was simultaneously announced by Microsoft, but no other OEMs had yet released it for their machines. Because Microsoft already sells in Europe a multitasking version of DOS, which is called DOS 4.0, it is not clear if Microsoft will use a different version number for the new operating system. IBM also ships OS/2 Extended Edition 1.0, which adds the IBM-developed components Communications Manager and Database Manager.
1988	July	Concurrently with the July 19 DOS 4.0 announcement, Microsoft released an extended memory specification, XMS, Version 2.0, implemented by the device driver HIMEM.SYS in Windows/286. When run on 286- and 386-based systems, XMS brings DOS memory management to three new regions of memory: Upper memory blocks (UMBs) above the video RAM and below the BIOS ROM: otherwise unused regions that can be used by EMS hardware and software, and by 80386 memory managers such as QEMM and 386-to-the-Max; High memory area (HMA): boosts access to conventional memory by using the A20 handler that adds 64 KB normally considered part of the extended-memory address range, used by multitasking software such as DESQview and Windows/286; Extended memory, born in August 1984 with the IBM AT and DOS 3.0, but suffering from lack of management as RAM disks and disk caches battled over the region, now has a sturdy mechanism for governance; The other EMS 4.0 partners are evaluating the XMS spec, but stopped short of endorsing it.
1988	August	The Phar Lap Virtual Memory Manager, scheduled for release in October, is unveiled at the Desqview Developers' Conference. The combination of Desqview, QEMM, and applications written to use Phar Lap's new product will run applications concurrently without memory restraints, something that OS/2 also promises. 386|DOS-Extender uses installed RAM, but with memory chips costing 100 times more per megabyte than hard disk memory, swapping to disk is more economical. DESQview 2.2, with significantly reduced RAM requirements, and QEMM 4.2 were also announced.
1988	September	IBM ships unannounced IBM DOS 4.01. Plagued with reports of bugs and incompatibilities, DOS 4.0 has been widely reported as being virtually unusable in its present state. IBM said that this was not a new version but a "maintenance diskette" to fix minor problems. However, early users said that the more serious incompatibilities resulting from a change in file structure have not been fixed by the upgrade. IBM also released two enhanced PS/2 Model 30s that use the classic AT bus rather than the MCA bus, based on the 286 instead of 8086 processor, with VGA instead of MCGA graphics and 1.44 MB disk drives replacing 720 KB drives.
1988	September	The Gang of Nine PC clone makers, led by Compaq, announced the Extended Industry Standard Architecture (EISA) bus. New EISA computers are expected by late 1989.
1988	September	Lotus, Intel and AST Research officially endorse XMS 2.0; Qualitas and Phar Lap say their products will support the spec as well. Although extended memory is faster than expanded memory, delays in acceptance of XMS, which brought the same sort of order to extended memory as the widely accepted EMS brought to expanded memory, meant that some developers still recommended that RAM beyond 1 MB on 286 and 386 machines be configured as expanded memory. By the end of 1989, XMS was still not in widespread use yet.
1988	October	Microsoft urged its OEMs to wait for a bug-fixing update of DOS 4.0 code before shipping their own versions. Microsoft released a DOS 4.0 Binary Adaption Kit - containing the operating system and utilities to help OEMs adapt it to their hardware - shortly after the mid-July announcement of DOS 4.0. Microsoft told manufacturers who distribute DOS under their own labels not to use that BAK and instead wait for the maintenance update, which contains several bug fixes, primarily for a problem with page frames involving EMS.
1988	October	IBM and Microsoft ship OS/2 1.1, which has the Presentation Manager graphical interface. IBM admitted that OS/2 hasn't "taken off" as planned; fewer applications than expected are available, and most OS/2-compatible applications are DOS applications running in OS/2's "compatibility box".
1988	November	NEC Home Electronics, maker of the MultiSync monitor line, forms the Video Electronics Standards Association (VESA) to promote a standard it calls Super VGA, which it says provides 56 percent more pixels on-screen than standard VGA.
1988	November	Microsoft releases MS-DOS 4.01, including the user shell and EMS support. Also, support for hard disk partitions up to 2 GB, and the SmartDrive disk caching program.
1989	January	Phar Lap's product line has expanded to include 386|VMM, a virtual memory add-in driver that uses the demand-paging hardware built into the 80386 and runs on top of 386|DOS-Extender.
1989	January	Developers Struggle With DOS Choices: As companies such as Lotus and Microsoft bring out improved but code-intensive versions of their programs, they're relying on bank-switching techniques or DOS extenders to make their programs run more efficiently under the 640K of RAM allowed by DOS. The choice is not a simple one. Each has its own set of assets and liabilities. But with OS/2 currently stalled in the market, there seems to be a future for alternatives. Microsoft has chosen bank switching for Excel and Windows, while Lotus has seriously looked at DOS extenders for its unreleased 1-2-3, Release 3.0.
1989	April	Compaq announced the availability of Compaq's MS-DOS version 4.01. Compaq continues to market their MS-DOS 3.31 as well. Compaq enhancements to MS-DOS 4.01 include Fastart, which speeds installation, and support for Lotus-Intel-Microsoft EMS 4.0.
1989	April	Intel announces the 486 (i486), which uses instruction pipelining, a technique used by RISC processors, to more than double the performance of the 386.
1989	April	VESA adopts an extended-VGA mode—Super VGA—displaying 800×600 resolution with 16 colors. Within months this expanded to support 1,024×768 pixels with 256 colors, which was called 1K VGA or 1024 display to distinguish this Super VGA from the 800×600 mode. VESA members formed an 8514/A subcommittee to make recommendations on an extended high-resolution, high-performance 8514/A standard. Several manufacturers have introduced 1,024×768 boards offering both interlaced and non-interlaced video, based on the Texas Instruments TMS34010 graphics controller chip. The TMS34010 is 20 percent faster (writing pixels per second) than the 8514/A, and TI's new TMS34020 is about 500 percent faster. Monitors supporting non-interlaced signals cost more.
1989	May	Lotus Development recently became the seventh software company to join the coalition promoting the Virtual Control Program Interface (VCPI) specification published by Phar Lap and Quarterdeck. Other members are AI Architects, Quadram, Qualitas and Rational Systems. VCPI resolved conflicts with memory managers by defining a communication protocol for the DOS extender to borrow RAM from the memory manager and use memory manager services to switch processor modes.
1989	June	Lotus ships Release 3.0 of its market leading spreadsheet 1-2-3, more than two years after the product was announced. The company spent $15 million bug testing 3.0, which was translated into C and uses extended memory by way of Rational Systems' VCPI-compatible DOS/16M 16-bit 80286 extender.
1989	July	InfoWorld reported that a year after its introduction, DOS 4.01's acceptance by users is slower than expected and lags behind the endorsements that greeted its predecessors. Users said they don't need its large disk partitions, can't afford to update their existing machines, and are wary of problems with how DOS 4.0 handles expanded memory. Also, no software developers have yet released applications that require the new version of DOS, which could force users to make the jump. Hardware vendors are taking longer than usual to adopt the new DOS for their hardware. Since other DOS updates have traditionally entered the workplace primarily accompanying the purchase of new PCs, this too hampered its adoption.
1989	September	InfoWorld reports that shadow RAM, a technique used by Chips and Technologies' NEAT chipset and AT/386 chipsets to speed performance by loading ROM-BIOS functions into the upper memory area, has become a significant problem for users who want to run programs that use DOS extenders on 1-megabyte systems. The problem arises when products like Lotus 1-2-3, Release 3.0 try to use the memory that is tied up supporting shadow RAM. Invisible Software Inc. announced a $40 program called Invisible RAM which extends DOS memory from 640K to as high as 736 K, allowing Release 3.0 users to load the program and have as much as 90 KB remaining for worksheet space. Or users could spend several hundred dollars for more memory, with prices continuing their slow decline.
1989	September	Microsoft unveils 16-bit OS/2 1.2, featuring the Installable File System API and High Performance File System (HPFS).
1989	October	VESA releases their Super VGA BIOS Extension standard VS891001, a specification to standardize a common software interface to Super VGA video adapters in order to provide simplified software application access to advanced VGA products.
1989	October	Compaq introduces the LTE, the first commercially successful IBM PC–compatible notebook computer.
1989	November	Compaq introduces their first EISA-based computers, the Deskpro 486 and the SystemPro, attempting to sway corporate accounts from minicomputers. NEC and Grid Systems Corporation also announced models incorporating the EISA bus. Hewlett-Packard was the first Gang of Nine member to introduce an EISA system. EISA system introductions signaled the start of product differentiation among the Gang of Nine vendors.
1989	November	Responding to increasing industry confusion about the relative roles of Windows and OS/2, during the COMDEX IBM and Microsoft jointly issue a news release titled "IBM and Microsoft Expand Partnership; Set Future DOS and OS/2 Directions." Most development resources will be applied to OS/2, with the intent to deliver a version that exploits the advanced abilities of the 386 and i486 in 1990, with advanced features such as demand paging, the ability to run multiple DOS applications concurrently, and allow applications to exploit the 32-bit flat memory model; and enable OS/2 for 2 MB entry systems. DOS and Windows are recommended for systems with 1-2 MB of memory or fixed disk drives smaller than 30 MB.
1989	December	Datalight runs an ad in Byte for their new ROMable operating system ROM-DOS, designed for embedded systems. They say it provides DOS 3.2 functionality, less networking, and uses 29 KB of ROM.
1990	January	In Dallas, representatives of the Japan Electronic Industries Development Association (JEIDA) meet with Personal Computer Memory Card International Association (PCMCIA) members to work out a PC Card standard for laptops. They would reach an agreement in May, when the cards—treated like floppy disks but not forced to emulate their formats—had capacities ranging from 512 KB to 4 megabytes.
1990	April	Digital Research introduces DR DOS 5.0, a DOS clone which is a strong competitor to MS-DOS 3.3 and 4.01. It includes the MemoryMax "memory manager", the first memory management system to allow loading TSRs, device drivers and the operating system into upper memory blocks, and the operating system to be loaded into the high memory area. Also, ViewMAX, a graphical front end functionally equivalent to MS-DOS 4.01's graphics shell. It supports hard disk partitions up to 512 MB.
1990	May	DOS Protected Mode Interface (DPMI) version 0.9 is formally released by a consortium of eleven PC companies. Unlike VCPI, DPMI was designed for a multitasking operating system.
1990	May	Microsoft releases Windows 3.0, which would become the first widely successful version of Windows. The improved interface resembles OS/2 Presentation Manager and fully supports EGA and VGA graphics adapters. Windows 3.0 runs on DOS 3.1 or higher, in one of three modes: Real mode runs Windows 2.x applications, much like previous Windows versions, with 640 KB of memory; Standard mode requires a 286 and 1 MB of memory; exploits extended memory and 16-bit 286 protected mode; 386 Enhanced mode requires a 386 and 2 MB of memory; its improved memory management mitigates the need for third-party 386 memory managers; Excluding maintenance releases, this is the last version of Windows that could run on 8088 and 8086-based XT-class PCs (in real mode).
1990	July	Digital Research ships DR DOS 5.0 to retailers. This was the first non-OEM version of DOS sold directly to end-users. About 40 percent of the nearly 7 million Intel-based PCs shipped this year will be shipped without an operating system, spelling big bucks for retail DOS sales.
1990	September	DESQview 386 version 2.3 and QEMM 5.1 ship.
1990	September	IBM and Microsoft announce a realignment of their OS/2 development relationship.
1990	October	Intel announces the Intel Flash Memory Card, available in 1 MB ($298) and 4 MB ($1199) models. It supports the PCMCIA and JEIDA standards. The flash memory-based card media is a DOS-compatible storage device using Microsoft's Flash File System (FFS), which is based on MS-DOS 3.3. Currently the only commercial applications of the memory cards are in the Poqet PC and some specialized embedded controllers.
1990	October	IBM announces its first true 486-based PS/2 machines, which have a 1,024×768 Extended Graphics Array (XGA) built onto their Micro Channel motherboards.
1990	November	IBM joins VESA and hands out copies of its XGA specification. The new standard comes as a blow to 8514/A manufacturers who spent three years reverse-engineering IBM's technology. Analysts say it would be difficult to modify XGA to work on ISA machines because XGA includes bus mastering.
1990	December	Microsoft introduces Windows 3.0a, a maintenance release that fixes several bugs sometimes causing unrecoverable application errors in Windows 3.0. There are no new features and this version has the same system requirements as Windows 3.0.
1991	February	IBM promised VESA members that it would soon introduce an ISA version of the XGA and an OEM version of the XGA chipset, but declined to give a time frame. The move put its orphaned 8514/A standard in a precarious state. Just weeks later, IBM reneged on selling the chips and said it would license XGA technology instead. VESA developers were concerned about the lack of technical information from IBM, and some said the market had moved beyond IBM's ability to set a de facto standard. InfoWorld tests would find that XGA was 6% faster than Super VGA in Excel and just 1% faster in PowerPoint.
1991	March	AddStor Inc. announces the first version of SuperStor on-the-fly disk compression software.
1991	March	Microsoft said that it had received a letter in June from the Federal Trade Commission advising it of an investigation of its competitive practices, limited to the November 1989 joint announcement with IBM regarding OS/2. Some industry executives think the investigation will lead the FTC to a range of what they consider to be anti-competitive practices by Microsoft. Digital Research said that after it introduced its DR DOS version 5.0 in April 1990, Microsoft immediately announced a version of MS-DOS, with "amazing similarity," which has yet to appear.
1991	March	Phar Lap introduces 386|DOS-Extender software development kit (SDK) version 3.0, which supports XMS and both the Real and Standard modes of Windows 3.0. Applications built with version 3.0 will be compatible with the upcoming MS-DOS 5.0; compatibility with Windows 386 Enhanced mode will be added in a later release.
1991	May	Phar Lap introduces the 286|DOS-Extender SDK, the first 16-bit DOS extender that works with Microsoft's entire C language toolkit—both the DOS (real mode) and OS/2 (protected mode) versions of the compiler, linker, libraries and debugger. 286|DOS-Extender can load an OS/2 application and then trap all of its OS/2 API calls and handle them within the DOS extender or convert them to equivalent MS-DOS function calls. In other words, Phar Lap created an OS/2 compatibility box for DOS. A 16-bit protected-mode DOS application can be built by compiling it with Microsoft C under DOS, specifying that an OS/2 program should be built, and then executing the resulting file on DOS with the aid of 286|DOS-Extender. With Lotus and Microsoft using DOS extenders, an increasing number of developers want the technology. Some experts say that DOS is still a better platform than Windows for multimedia applications, because of its hardware control, though its future may be doomed. 286|DOS-Extender is compatible with XMS, VCPI and DPMI in Windows 3.0.
1991	June	On June 11, IBM DOS 5.0 is released. It featured the moving of the DOS kernel and command.com into the high memory area.
1991	June	The same day, in New York, Microsoft released MS-DOS 5.0, followed by a party on the Hudson aboard a cruise ship dubbed DOS Boat, where Dave Brubeck performed "Take Five". The full-screen MS-DOS Editor is added to succeed Edlin. It adds undelete and unformat utilities, and task swapping. GW-BASIC is replaced with QBasic. It was immediately available for retail, but only as an upgrade for users of version 2.11 or later. By year-end there would be about 8 million copies in use, making it Microsoft's fastest-ever selling software.
1991	July	Novell announces that it intends to acquire Digital Research. Completion of the merger is expected in October. Both companies intend to augment DR DOS to handle basic Novell NetWare functions.
1991	July	Phar Lap announces the DPMI-compliant 386|DOS-Extender SDK version 4.0, which supports large extended-DOS applications running under Windows 386 Enhanced mode. Rational Systems announces DOS/4G, a DPMI-compliant 32-bit DOS extender, and BigWin, a 32-bit application extender for Windows 386 Enhanced mode which lets developers proceed with 32-bit development before Microsoft delivers a 32-bit version of Windows.
1991	July	Microsoft says they will no longer call a new operating system they are working on OS/2 3.0—the new operating system will be named Windows NT (New Technology), which will not be able to run programs written for OS/2. Windows NT will be geared for more powerful computers and workstations, while a low-end version of Windows will run on top of MS-DOS.
1991	September	Digital Research releases DR DOS 6.0 with AddStor's SuperStor disk compression.
1991	October	Microsoft introduces Windows 3.0 with Multimedia Extensions. This version, sold via OEMs only, includes Media Player, Music Box (audio CD player), Sound Recorder, a new clock, screen savers, upgraded Help file support, joystick, MIDI, and sound support (recording and playing). While still having the same system requirements as Windows 3.0 and including Real mode support, most of the new features require Standard mode or 386 Enhanced mode to run. This version of Windows was required in the MPC Level 1 specifications of the era.
1991	November	Several companies announce or demonstrate proprietary local-bus graphics technologies at COMDEX. VESA is hoping to create a local-bus standard.
1992	February	The VESA XGA Video Subsystem Interface Proposal is shelved after IBM objects to the use of its trademarked term "XGA" in the proposal.
1992	April	Microsoft introduces Windows 3.1, which requires an 80286 processor with at least 1MB memory running MS-DOS 3.1 or higher. New features include TrueType font support, stability improvements, 32-bit disk access (when run in 386 Enhanced mode), and multimedia support for all customers (not just OEMs, as was the case for Windows 3.0 with Multimedia Extensions). The new multimedia abilities in Windows hastened the decline of MS-DOS for use with multimedia applications and was a requirement to meet Microsoft's Multimedia PC (MPC) standard.
1992	April	IBM licenses XGA technology to Intel. So far XGA has appeared in only a handful of IBM's own systems.
1992	June	VESA outlines its proposed VESA Local Bus specification, and Intel unveils its proposed Peripheral Component Interconnect (PCI) spec.
1992	August	VESA Local Bus (VL-Bus) Standard 1.0 is ratified. By moving video cards from the 8-MHz, 16-bit ISA expansion bus to the CPU's 32-bit local bus running at full clock speed, vendors may improve high-resolution graphics performance on 486-based PCs.
1992	October	Forbes ranks Microsoft chairman Bill Gates as America's richest person, topping its Forbes 400 list.
1992	October	Windows for Workgroups 3.1 is introduced, which includes native network support, no longer relying on networking in MS-DOS. For 80386 users, file and print sharing is introduced and the native driver VSHARE.386 replaces the need for the MS-DOS SHARE.EXE.
1992	November	At COMDEX, VESA said it would upgrade its local bus standard to support multimedia. Intel said PCI, due in March, could be used instead of high-speed buses such as EISA, MCA and TURBOchannel.
1993	January	Microsoft overtakes IBM in market capitalization. Each is valued at over $26 billion.
1993	January	Stac Electronics, the maker of Stacker disk compression software, sues Microsoft for infringement of two of its file compression patents by the upcoming MS-DOS 6.0.
1993	February	Microsoft countersues Stac. Microsoft unveils its Visual C++ integrated development environment for Windows, which integrates CodeView functionality. Phar Lap announces that 286|DOS-Extender Lite, which supports 2 MB of memory, will be included with every copy of Microsoft's compiler. Users wanting CodeView support or access to up to 16 MB of memory must buy 286|DOS-Extender SDK. Phar Lap also announces 386|DOS-Extender SDK 5.0, which turns DOS into a 32-bit operating environment with a flat address space of up to 4 gigabytes. Rational Systems announces DOS/16M version 5.0, which supports Visual C++ and CodeView.
1993	March	At the Windows Hardware Engineering Conference (WinHEC) Intel announced its PCI specification—and its Pentium processor. The increasingly popular VL-Bus is tightly coupled to the abilities of the 486, a design disadvantage when working with the Pentium's 64-bit memory interface, but a VESA member said that the VL-Bus spec wasn't finished. The first PCI chip sets and Pentium systems are expected in May.
1993	March	Microsoft introduces MS-DOS 6.0. This version was the first to include MEMMAKER conventional memory management, DoubleSpace disk compression, new disk utilities (SCANDISK and disk defragment), anti-virus, backup and PC-to-PC file transfer utilities, power management, enhanced disk caching, a more user-friendly HELP utility, improved accessibility for those with disabilities, and a system diagnostics program. Some of the utilities were licensed from third-parties.
1993	March	Novell tried to dampen Microsoft's DOS 6 launch with the announcement that the new Novell DOS 7, based on the integration of DR DOS 6.0 and Novell's NetWare Lite, will include advances such as peer-to-peer networking that Microsoft left out of its latest release.
1993	June	IBM announces PC DOS 6.1, to be available in late July, except disk compression, which is expected by the end of September. E replaces the MS-DOS Editor. According to IBM, the PC DOS kernel is based on the MS-DOS 6 kernel. However, in July IBM officials said the compression utility (a version of AddStor's SuperStor) is incompatible with OS/2 2.1, so users must decompress drives to move data back and forth. IBM and AddStor were working on a fix. After three months on the market, Computerworld said that the PC-DOS 6.1 user base was "minuscule" compared with MS-DOS', and the product faced "a hard uphill run" to escape niche status.
1993	August	A month after the Federal Trade Commission deadlocks for the second time with a 2–2 vote on whether to take action against Microsoft, the Justice Department officially notified Microsoft that it was proceeding with the case, ending the FTC's three-year investigation.
1993	August	Microsoft releases Windows 3.11, a minor update to Windows 3.1 that includes updated drivers, better Novell Netware support, and a few bugfixes to Windows core files. (This version is distinct from Windows for Workgroups 3.11).
1993	November	VL-Bus Standard 2.0 is released. The new standard requires faster timing speeds, and runs faster than PCI. However, no applications, except perhaps multimedia, need the superior bandwidth, according to the chairman of a PCI interest group.
1993	November	Microsoft replaces MS-DOS 6.0 with MS-DOS 6.2, leapfrogging IBM's PC DOS 6.1. This version improved the stability of the included DoubleSpace disk compression.
1993	November	Microsoft releases Windows for Workgroups 3.11. This version drops support for 286 processors (no longer contains Standard mode), but adds 32-bit file access, 32-bit networking, and the 32-bit VCACHE.386.
1993	December	Novell releases Novell DOS 7.
1993	December	PTS-DOS is introduced as PTS-DOS 6.4
1994	February	A jury finds Microsoft guilty of patent infringement, and Stac Electronics guilty of trade secret theft. On the day the jury returned its verdict, Microsoft released MS-DOS 6.21, removing DoubleSpace disk compression.
1994	April	IBM signs a deal with Stac to use their LZS compression technology in future products, then releases PC DOS 6.3, including SuperStor/DS, a DoubleSpace-compatible version of AddStor's disk compression utility.
1994	June	After a judge ordered Microsoft to recall all unsold infringing products worldwide, Microsoft settled its dispute with Stac, and released MS-DOS 6.22, bringing back disk compression with internally developed DriveSpace, which is about 5% slower than DoubleSpace.
1994	June	With the intent to create a "public domain" version of MS-DOS, Jim Hall announces the open-source project PD-DOS. Later, to ensure that the OS would remain free, the GNU General Public License is used to license code and the name is changed to FreeDOS.
1994	July	Microsoft settles with the United States Department of Justice Antitrust Division, signing a consent decree agreeing to end certain practices for 6 1/2 years: Per-processor licenses forcing PC makers to pay royalties for Microsoft software with every machine shipped, even those shipped without any Microsoft software; Unreasonably long contracts—typically three to five years; licenses are limited to one or two years; Overly restrictive non-disclosure agreements; such agreements are limited to one year and can't prevent programmers from working on rival operating systems; Requiring PC makers to purchase another Microsoft product as a condition for licensing a Microsoft operating system
1994	November	Microsoft introduces Microsoft Windows Simplified Chinese 3.2, a.k.a. "Windows 3.2". This version was an update to the Simplified Chinese version of Windows 3.1, adding a few more IMEs (Input Method Editors) and a Chinese font editor. Otherwise, it is the same as Windows 3.11 and no other market received a "Windows 3.2".
1995	February	IBM releases PC DOS 7.0, replacing SuperStor/DS with Stac Electronics' Stacker, Version 4.02. This is the first DOS to feature a command-line calculator, a program to load device drivers from the command line, Rexx language support, and a viewer that can open help files other than its own (OS/2 INF style).
1995	March	WinHEC featured the high-speed serial bus needed for multimedia. Support for both P1394 aka FireWire and Universal Serial Bus (USB) is expected by 1996 updates to Windows 95. USB will be supported by Intel's Native Signal Processing.
1995	June	ECMA adopts the 2nd edition of standard ECMA-107, Volume and File Structure of Disk Cartridges for Information Interchange, standardizing FAT16 support for zip drives and optical discs.
1995	July	PTS-DOS 7.0 is released.
1995	August	Intel announces the new ATX motherboard specification, which essentially rotates IBM's Baby AT motherboard by 90 degrees within the computer case. The 8 1/2-by-13-inch Baby AT planar board has been the de facto standard for most of the DOS era, but would soon be replaced by the Pentium processor-based ATX, a more space-efficient design which added support for multimedia (motherboard-based audio and video). ATX supports USB.

== 1995–2000: Windows 9x era ==
1995	August	Windows 95 is released, launching the Windows 9x era. It comes with an MS-DOS–like bootloader reporting DOS version 7.0. All code is moved into IO.SYS, while MSDOS.SYS is now a text file containing bootup parameters. LBA hard disk support is added.
1996	July	Novell sells Novell DOS 7 to Caldera, Inc.
1996	September	Windows 95 OEM Service Release 2.0 (OSR2.0) is made available to PC vendors. It comes with MS-DOS 7.1, which adds support for the FAT32 file system, but not for USB.
1997	February	Caldera, Inc., releases OpenDOS 7.01 by Caldera UK, Ltd.
1997	May	Caldera, Inc., releases M.R.S. open-source kit of OpenDOS 7.01 by Caldera UK, Ltd on 1997-05-05. This is also the first DOS to be released on a CD-ROM.
1997	August	Windows 95 OSR2.1 is released with a supplement providing limited USB support.
1997	December	Caldera, Inc., releases DR-OpenDOS 7.02 by Caldera UK, Ltd.
1998	March	Caldera re-releases DR-OpenDOS 7.02 as the closed source DR-DOS 7.02, which is Y2K compliant.
1998	March	FreeDOS 0.1 (Beta 1 "Orlando") is released.
1998	May	IBM releases PC DOS 2000, which has minor Y2K fixes for older computers which do not properly handle the century rollover. It also supports the Euro currency symbol.
1998	June	Windows 98 is released for retail at one minute past midnight on the 25th. It also comes with MS-DOS 7.1, but now FAT32 support is available to any purchaser, not just OEM. Allows users to create an Emergency Boot Disk that boots into MS-DOS 7.1, which includes real-mode CD-ROM drivers and MS-DOS utilities used to access a malfunctioning Windows 98 installation. Due to the number of files that must fit on a 1.44MB 3.5" disk, a RAMDrive is created and a compressed CAB file is extracted into the RAMDrive upon bootup.
1998	August	Caldera, Inc. creates two new subsidiaries, Caldera Systems, Inc., and Caldera Thin Clients, Inc.
1998	October	FreeDOS 0.2 (Beta 2 "Marvin") is released.
1999	January	Caldera Thin Clients, Inc., releases Caldera DR-DOS 7.03 by Caldera UK, Ltd.
1999	February	Caldera, Inc., closes Caldera UK, Ltd.
1999	April	FreeDOS 0.3 (Beta 3 "Ventura") is released.
1999	May	Windows 98 Second Edition is released to manufacturing. It also comes with MS-DOS 7.1, which appears to be unchanged.
1999	July	Caldera Thin Clients, Inc., becomes Lineo, Inc., who re-releases DR-DOS as Caldera DR-DOS 7.03.
1999	September	PTS-DOS 2000 is released.
1999	November	Versions of OEM DR-DOS branded 7.04/7.05 are released.
2000	April	FreeDOS 0.4 (Beta 4 "Lemur") is released.
2000	August	FreeDOS 0.5 (Beta 5 "Lara") is released.
2000	August	PC DOS 7.1 build 1.10.
2000	September	Windows ME is released, identifying itself as MS-DOS 8.0. This is the last version of MS-DOS, as future versions of Windows would be based on the Windows NT architecture.

== 2001–present: Post-millennium ==
2001	January	PC DOS 7.1 build 1.11.
2001	March	FreeDOS 0.6 (Beta 6 "Midnite") is released.
2001	September	FreeDOS 0.7 (Beta 7 "Spears") is released.
2001	October	Windows XP is released for retail sale, beginning the transition from mainstream DOS usage.
2001	December	Support ends for MS-DOS, Windows 95, and earlier versions of Windows.
2002	April	FreeDOS 0.8 (Beta 8) is released.
2002	July	Udo Kuhnt starts the DR-DOS/OpenDOS Enhancement Project, based on source of OpenDOS 7.01.
2002	July	PC DOS 7.1 build 1.19.
2002	November	DeviceLogics is founded; they purchased DR-DOS from Lineo.
2003	March	PC DOS 7.1 build 1.26.
2003	July	PC DOS 7.1 build 1.28.
2003	September	PC DOS 7.1 build 1.29.
2003	December	PC DOS 7.1 build 1.32.
2004	March	DeviceLogics releases DR-DOS 8.0, adding FAT32 and large partition support.
2004	September	FreeDOS 0.9 (Beta 9) is released.
2004	4th quarter	Sometime between mid-October and early December, DeviceLogics changes their name to DR DOS Inc.
2005	March	Udo Kuhnt releases Enhanced DR-DOS 7.01.07 with FAT32 and LBA support.
2005	June	GNU/DOS is released. GNU/DOS is a FreeDOS distribution for desktops which includes some FreeDOS utilities, much of the DJGPP suite including many GNU utilities, Vim, Arachne, and OpenGEM.
2005	October	DR DOS Inc. releases DR-DOS 8.1, and removes it before the end of the month, rolling back to version 7.03, according to the FreeDOS Project, which alleged GPL violations. DR-DOS 7.03 was offered for sale until summer 2018, when the drdos.com website shut down.
2006	July	Extended support ended for Windows 98 and Windows ME.
2006	September	FreeDOS 1.0 is released.
2006	November	GNU/DOS is discontinued.
2012	January	FreeDOS 1.1 is released.
2013	October	Rod Canion's book Open reveals that, in late 1983, Compaq licensed their version of DOS to Microsoft, a fact that had remained secret for 30 years. Compaq's engineers had been finding and fixing hundreds of PC DOS incompatibilities, making their MS-DOS version very different than the one Microsoft had been distributing.
2014	March	Microsoft makes the source code available to MS-DOS versions 1.1 and 2.0. The files may be downloaded from the Computer History Museum website under a "Microsoft research license agreement".
2014	October	CP/M source code becomes available on the Computer History Museum website for early releases from 1975 (before there was an official version number), 1976 (version 1.3), 1978 (1.4), and 1979 (2.0).
2016	December	FreeDOS 1.2 is released.
2020	September	Source code of MS-DOS versions 3.30 and 6.0 was leaked online on 4chan.
2022	February	FreeDOS 1.3 is released.
2024	April	Microsoft releases MS-DOS 4.0 source code on GitHub.
2025	April	FreeDOS 1.4 is released.
2025	May	Microsoft releases a modern remake of the MS-DOS Editor, which first appeared in MS-DOS 5.0 (1991). The new open-source tool, built with Rust, works on Windows, macOS, and Linux.
2026	January	First public beta of DR DOS 9.0.

== See also ==
- Comparison of DOS operating systems
- List of DOS commands
- Timeline of Intel
- Timeline of Microsoft
- Timeline of Microsoft Windows
- Timeline of operating systems
- Comparison of operating systems
- List of operating systems
