= Operating environment =

Environment in which users run application software

In computer software, an operating environment or integrated applications environment is the environment in which users run application software. The environment consists of a user interface provided by an applications manager and usually an application programming interface (API) to the applications manager.

An operating environment is not a full operating system, but is a form of middleware that rests between the OS and the application. For example, the first version of Windows, Windows 1.0, was not a full operating system, but a GUI laid over MS-DOS albeit with an API of its own. Similarly, the IBM U2 system operates on both Unix/Linux and Windows NT. Usually the user interface is text-based or graphical, rather than a command-line interface (e.g., the Unix shell), which is often the interface of the underlying operating system.

In the mid 1980s, text-based and graphical user interface operating environments surrounded the MS-DOS operating system with a shell that turned the user's display into a menu-oriented "desktop" for selecting and running IBM PC compatible applications. These operating environment systems allow users much of the convenience of integrated software without locking them into a single package.

== History ==
In the mid 1980s, text-based and graphical user interface operating environments such as IBM TopView, Windows, Digital Research's GEM Desktop, GEOS and Quarterdeck Office Systems's DESQview surrounded the MS-DOS operating system with a shell that turned the user's display into a menu-oriented "desktop" for selecting and running IBM PC compatible applications. These programs were more than simple menu systems—as alternate operating environments they were substitutes for integrated programs such as Framework and Symphony, that allowed switching, windowing, and cut-and-paste operations among dedicated applications. These operating environment systems gave users much of the convenience of integrated software without locking them into a single package. Alternative operating environments made terminate-and-stay-resident pop-up utilities such as Borland Sidekick redundant. Windows provided its own version of these utilities, and placing them under central control could eliminate memory conflicts that RAM-resident utilities create. In later versions, Windows evolved from an operating environment into a complete operating system with MS-DOS as a bootloader (Windows 3.1 and Windows 9x) and a cleanroom operating system, Windows NT, was developed at the same time. All versions after Windows ME have been based on the Windows NT kernel.

== See also ==
- Desktop environment, the graphical user interface to the computer
- File manager
- Integrated environment
- Integrated development environment, a type of computer software that assists computer programmers in developing software
- Runtime environment, a virtual machine state which provides software services for processes or programs while a computer is running
- X Window System
