= Philip Don Estridge =

American personal computer industry pioneer (1937–1985)

Don Estridge
- Born: June 23, 1937; Jacksonville, Florida, US
- Died: August 2, 1985 (aged 48); Irving, Texas, US
- Cause of death: Plane crash onboard Delta Air Lines Flight 191
- Education: University of Florida
- Known for: Developing the original IBM Personal Computer (PC)
- Spouse: Mary Ann Hellier (m. 1958)
- Children: 3
- Scientific career
- Fields: Computer science
- Workplaces: IBM

Philip Donald Estridge (June 23, 1937 – August 2, 1985), known as Don Estridge, was an American computer engineer who led development of the original IBM Personal Computer (PC), and thus is known as the "father of the IBM PC". He opened its specifications, which revolutionized the computer industry, resulting in a vast increase in sales of personal computers and creating an entire industry of hardware compatible PCs.

== Early life ==
Estridge was born in Jacksonville, Florida. His father was a professional photographer. He graduated from Bishop Kenny High School in 1955, and from the University of Florida in 1959. He married Mary Ann Hellier in September, 1958, and they had three daughters: Patricia Ann, Mary Evelyn and Sandra Marie. He completed a bachelor's degree in electrical engineering at the University of Florida and worked at the Army, designing a radar system using computers, IBM and finally NASA's Goddard Space Flight Center until he moved to Boca Raton, Florida, in 1969.

== IBM ==
Before being the leader of the team to develop the IBM PC he had been the lead manager for the development of the IBM Series/1 mini-computer. After this project, in 1979, he was assigned to manage a Series/1 special bid development group. This engineering and planning organization was responsible for responding to custom system solutions requested by large account sales and marketing representatives. One of the largest and most successful special bids ever won by IBM was the Series/1 Agent Computer System for the State Farm Insurance company. In mid-1980, he was rewarded with the opportunity to lead IBM's efforts in the emerging personal computer business.

His efforts to develop the IBM PC began when he took control of the IBM Entry Level Systems in 1980 (and was later named president of the newly formed IBM Entry Systems Division (ESD) in August 1983), with the goal of developing a low-cost personal computer to compete against increasingly popular offerings from the likes of Apple Computer, Commodore International, and other perceived IBM competitors. To create a cost-effective alternative to those companies' products, Estridge realized that it would be necessary to rely on third-party hardware and software. This was a marked departure from previous IBM strategy, which centered on in-house vertical development of complicated mainframe systems and their requisite access terminals. Estridge also published the specifications of the IBM PC, allowing a booming third-party aftermarket hardware business to take advantage of the machine's expansion card slots.

The competitive cost and expandability options of the first model, the IBM PC model 5150, as well as IBM's reputation, led to strong sales to both enterprise and home customers. Estridge was rapidly promoted, and by 1984 was IBM Vice President, Manufacturing, supervising all manufacturing worldwide. Steve Jobs offered Estridge a multimillion-dollar job as president of Apple Computer but he declined.

== Death and legacy ==
Estridge and wife Mary Ann died in the crash of Delta Air Lines Flight 191 at Dallas/Fort Worth International Airport on August 2, 1985. He was 48 years old. At the time of his death, IBM ESD, which included the development and manufacturing of the IBM PC, PC DOS, PC LAN and TopView, had nearly 10,000 employees and had sold over a million PCs.

Estridge has been honored many times. In 1999, he was identified in CIO magazine as one of the people who "invented the enterprise". The Don Estridge High-Tech Middle School — formerly IBM Facility Building 051 — in Boca Raton, Florida, is named after him, and received Estridge's IBM 5150 personal computers from his family on the occasion of its dedication in 2004.
