= EComStation =

Operating system

eComStation

- eComStation screenshot
- Developer: PayGlobal Technologies BV (Previously Serenity Systems, Mensys BV, XEU.com. Based on code from IBM, Microsoft, and other developers)
- OS family: OS/2
- Working state: Inactive
- Source model: Closed source
- Initial release: July 2001; 25 years ago
- Latest release: 2.1 / May 20, 2011; 15 years ago
- Latest preview: 2.2 Beta II / December 16, 2013; 12 years ago
- License: Proprietary software with open-source components
- Official website: ecomstation.com (archived at Wayback Machine)

eComStation or eCS is an operating system based on OS/2 Warp for the 32-bit x86 architecture. It was originally developed by Serenity Systems and Mensys BV under license from IBM. It includes additional applications, and support for new hardware which were not present in OS/2 Warp. It is intended to allow OS/2 applications to run on modern hardware, and is used by a number of large organizations for this purpose. By 2014, approximately thirty to forty thousand licenses of eComStation had been sold.

Financial difficulties at Mensys in 2012 led to the development of eComStation stalling, and ownership being transferred to a sister company named XEU.com (now known as PayGlobal Technologies BV). The lack of a new release since 2011 was one of the motivations for the creation of the ArcaOS OS/2 distribution.

== Differences between eComStation and OS/2 ==
Version 1 of eComStation, released in 2001, was based around the integrated OS/2 version 4.5 client Convenience Package for OS/2 Warp version 4, which was released by IBM in 2000. The latter had been made available only to holders of existing OS/2 support contracts; it included the following new features (among others) compared to the final retail version of OS/2 (1996's OS/2 Warp version 4):

- IBM-supplied updates of software and components that had shipped with the 1999 release of OS/2 Warp Server for e-business, but had not been made available to users of the client version. Key among these were the JFS file system and the logical volume manager.
- Operating system features and enhancements that had been made available as updates but never offered as an install-time option. These included an updated kernel, a 32-bit TCP/IP stack and associated networking utilities, a firewall, updated drivers and other system components, newer versions of Java, SciTech SNAP Graphics video support, and more.
- IBM-supplied updates that had previously only been offered to customers with maintenance contracts, such as UDF support and a new USB stack.

eComStation provided a retail channel for end users to obtain these updates. In addition, from the beginning it bundled a number of additional features and enhancements, including (but not limited to):

- Value-added applications, including the Lotus SmartSuite office suite, IBM's Desktop On-call remote-control software, and more.
- Utilities and drivers licensed from third parties including scanner support and drivers for multiple serial cards, as well as enhanced storage drivers developed by Daniela Engert.
- A number of features from OS/2 Warp 4 which IBM had omitted from the Convenience Package release, such as voice navigation and dictation.
- System improvements developed by Serenity itself including a new installer, various user interface enhancements, system configuration changes, and a rapid deployment system based on Serenity Managed Client.
- Open-source utilities from the Unix world.
- A number of small utilities and drivers developed by various third parties.

As IBM began to wind down OS/2 development, Serenity and its partners began to take up the slack (through a combination of in-house, contract, and community/open source development efforts) in terms of keeping the operating system usable on newer hardware. The results of many of these efforts are included in version 2 of eComStation; among others:

- ACPI support.
- A new generic graphic card driver called Panorama.
- A bootable version of JFS.
- A 'universal' sound card driver based on ALSA.
- AHCI support (introduced in version 2.1).
- On-the-fly resizing of hard drive partitions.
- A new client to access CIFS/SMB (Windows-style) LAN resources (supporting both files and printers) based upon Samba.
- Ports of Mozilla Firefox and Mozilla Thunderbird for browsing and email.
- A port of the OpenOffice.org office suite.

A server version of eComStation is available, which is based on IBM OS/2 Warp Server for e-business (WSeB) 4.52. It includes the same set of software bundled with WSeB, which includes the IBM WebSphere Application Server, and the Lotus Domino Go Webserver.

== History ==
=== Origins ===
When it became clear that IBM would not release any new retail version of the OS/2 Warp client operating system after version 4 in 1996, users began to consider other alternatives. IBM released a final version of its server edition, IBM OS/2 Warp Server for e-Business or WSeB, internally called version 4.5. IBM also continued updating the client and merged parts of it with the server, so it was proposed by Bob St. John of Serenity Systems, that an OEM company could and should create its own client, using the existing OS/2 client with IBM enhancements and adding its own improvements where needed. But Serenity as an IBM business partner had done a similar thing with OS/2-based vertical applications like the Serenity Managed Client, a rapid deployment OS based on Workspace On-Demand, and Ecomstation Server, a managed server based on WSeB. The OS/2 software vendor Stardock made such a proposal to IBM in 1999, but it was not followed through by the company.

On April 29, 2000, Serenity itself in conjunction with Kim Cheung of Touchvoice Systems created a discussion group for the purpose of discussing the OS/2 community's interest in a "new Managed Client for eBusiness using components of WSeB" called eComStation to replace the one based on WoD, the idea was brought up to also create a new non-remote boot client — in effect an OEM version of the OS/2 client. Although Serenity's initial response to a suggestion of a thick client was negative, the response was positive enough from the community and from IBM to get things moving, and just a few months later the first eCS preview was shipped. Notwithstanding Cheung's fairly simple initial concept, community input was actively solicited from the beginning, and feature requests quickly began coming in. The final GA release of eComStation 1.0 was not released until July 2001, and was significantly different from the original preview in many respects.

=== Release history ===
Date of last edition taken from the installation CDs, the official release dates may be different. Release dates refer to the US English editions unless otherwise noted.

- September 29, 2000 - eComStation preview
- July 10, 2001 - eComStation 1.0
- April 18, 2003 - eComStation 1.1
- August 12, 2004 - eComStation 1.2
- November 4, 2005 - eComStation 1.2R (Media Refresh)
- June 18, 2007 - eComStation 2.0 RC1
- December 25, 2007 - eComStation 2.0 RC4
- July 4, 2008 - eComStation 2.0 RC5
- December 6, 2008 - eComStation 2.0 RC6
- August 11, 2009 - eComStation 2.0 RC7 Silver
- May 15, 2010 - eComStation 2.0 GA
- May 7, 2011 - eComStation 2.1 GA
- February 28, 2013 - eComStation 2.2 Beta Demo CD
- March 25, 2013 - eComStation 2.2 Beta 1
- December 13, 2013 - eComStation 2.2 Beta II

==== Version 1.0 ====
eComStation 1.0 was built on the 2000 release of IBM's Convenience Package for OS/2 Warp version 4 (commonly referred to as MCP or MCP1). Additionally, several commercial applications were bundled with the operating system package, most notably Lotus SmartSuite for OS/2 and IBM Desktop On-Call.

The IBM OS/2 install routine was no longer used; instead, a rapid-deployment system based on Cheung's WiseManager product was utilized to install the operating system components. In addition, a number of enhancements to the OS/2 user interface had been integrated, including a revamped desktop layout with entirely new icons, customizable graphic effects in a number of windowing components, redesigned system dialogs, and an enhanced, user-extensible system shutdown.

Once the English edition was released, efforts turned to making other language editions (called National Language Versions, or NLVs) available. However, the first non-English NLV targeted, German, was not released until the end of 2001, due in large part to the greater-than-anticipated effort of localizing the redesigned installer and other new materials. Ultimately, no further non-English NLVs were released for eComStation 1.0; other languages would not become available until eComStation 1.1 or 1.2.

==== Version 1.1 ====
eComStation 1.1 included several major new features compared to version 1.0. The largest change to the operating system as installed was a package of wide-ranging functional enhancements to the desktop environment (Workplace Shell), based on the open source XWorkplace project from NetLabs.org. These included desktop folder enhancements such as status bars and improved sorting options, a new virtual desktop feature, a customizable desktop toolbar with support for programmable "widgets", and expanded configuration options. Various other enhancements such as built-in support for PPPoE and PPtP Internet connections were also provided.

In addition, a completely new install process was designed. The bootable code on the installation CD was rewritten to improve compatibility with modern BIOSes, and a "pre-boot menu" was introduced which allowed the user to select various drivers and kernel options to use in booting from the CD. The graphical installer from eComStation 1.0 was replaced with a new, more streamlined interface.

eComStation 1.1 was based on the 2001 release of IBM's Convenience Package 2 for OS/2 Warp version 4 (also known as MCP2), with subsequent IBM service updates integrated.

With this version, Serenity Systems separated the base operating system product from the major commercial applications that were bundled with it in eComStation 1.0. The base eComStation 1.1 product was sold under the title "eComStation Entry"; and the applications, including Lotus SmartSuite 1.7 and HOBlink X11 Server, were packaged separately in the eComStation Application Pack.

Multi-processor support was not included in eComStation Entry, due to the additional license fees required by IBM at the time. Instead, an SMP package was available from eComStation retailers as a paid extra.

With the release of eComStation 1.1, an eComStation Server Edition was also made available, based on the OS/2 Warp Server for e-business product.

Besides English, there were also German and Russian NLVs released for eComStation 1.1.

==== Version 1.2 ====
The principal new feature of eComStation 1.2, as advertised, was revamped desktop multimedia support. Updated versions of various bundled components, both IBM and non-IBM, were also included.

eComStation 1.2 was released in English, German and Dutch NLVs.

==== Version 1.2 media refresh (1.2R) ====
Serenity Systems announced its intention to provide a "media refresh" incorporating a number of fixes and updates which had been made available after the release of eComStation 1.2. This was released as version 1.2R, initially on November 12, 2005, but subsequently withdrawn and re-released (due to a last-minute bug fix) on November 17, 2005.

The principal new feature of eComStation 1.2R was support for installation on Athlon 64 systems, which had previously required unsupported workarounds.

eComStation 1.2R was released in English, German, and Italian NLVs. Additionally, a beta release of a Traditional Chinese NLV was made available via download for registered customers.

==== Version 2.0 ====
eComStation 2.0 had a longer-than-usual development cycle. The first beta was released on December 21, 2005, with the first "release candidate" being announced on June 18, 2007; the final GA release was not available until May 2010.

The biggest change in eComStation 2.0 was the addition of ACPI support, which represented the first major update to the core operating system to be developed specifically for eComStation (and not by IBM). The benefits of ACPI included support for modern hardware, including advanced power management features, as well as support for IRQs above 15. In addition, the new ACPI driver allowed access to OS/2's symmetric multi-processing support, obviating the need for IBM's proprietary SMP-enablement driver. Consequently, starting with eComStation 2.0, SMP support was included in the base product at no additional cost.

The other major feature introduced in version 2.0 was an enhanced version of the Journaled File System which allowed the operating system to be booted directly from JFS-formatted partitions. (Previous versions of JFS had only been usable on non-bootable data partitions.) Installing the operating system onto JFS allowed a significant performance improvement, due to the much larger cache sizes supported by JFS, as well as reduced CHKDSK times in the event of a non-clean shutdown.

The eComStation pricing model was revamped significantly with version 2.0. The standard consumer version was the Home & Student Edition. This edition had a lower recommended retail price than previous versions of eComStation; however, one customer was limited to five purchases. The Business Edition was targeted at commercial customers, with no limit on the number of purchases. The Business Edition also came with telephone support, whereas Home & Student Edition customers were limited to e-mail and online assistance. Software-wise, the two products were identical; only the license terms differed, as noted above.

Both editions of eComStation 2.0 included the OpenOffice.org office suite (provided on a separate CD). The Application Pack which had been available for previous versions was discontinued.

eComStation 2.0 was available in English only; the release of all other language versions was deferred until version 2.1.

==== Version 2.1 ====
eComStation 2.1 was released only a year after version 2.0, in May 2011.

Version 2.1 has two significant new features. The first is support for AHCI disk controllers, via a newly developed device driver. The second is the replacement of the old IBM Boot Manager with the open-source Air-Boot software, which does not require a primary partition and is therefore easier to install on disks with pre-existing operating systems.

eComStation 2.1 also updates some of the included applications, notably Mozilla Firefox, and has some minor improvements to the installer.

As of version 2.1, much of the former branding by Serenity Systems has been removed from the released product, and replaced by that of Mensys BV.

eComStation 2.1 is available in English and German NLVs. A preview release of a Japanese NLV was made available to certain customers.

== Open source software ==
eComStation is also complemented by several open source applications that are included in the installer:

- XWorkplace which is Workplace Shell enhancement software under GNU GPL License
- Mozilla Firefox
- Mozilla Thunderbird
- WarpIn, an open source general-purpose installer under GNU GPL license.
- PM VNC server, remote control software.
- Doodle Screen Saver, a Workplace Shell screen saver under GNU GPL license.
- NewView, a documentation reader for .inf files that replaces view.exe.

== Hardware requirements ==
Minimum hardware requirements for running eComStation (any version) are:

Processor	Intel Pentium 133 MHz or equivalent
Memory (RAM)	48MB for installation from CD 160MB to use Demo CD
Graphics Card	VGA video card with at least 512KB of video RAM
HDD free space	500MB of available disk space
Optical drive	CD-ROM Drive – SATA, IDE or SCSI CD-ROM drive
Mouse	Any PS/2, serial or USB mouse
