= SciTech =

SciTech, Scitech or Sci Tech may refer to:

== Businesses and organizations ==
- Scitech, a not-for-profit science and technology organization in Western Australia
- Sci-Tech Daresbury, a science-related business campus near Daresbury, Cheshire, England
- SciTech Software, a developer of display-related software

== High schools ==
- Pittsburgh Science and Technology Academy, in Pittsburgh, Pennsylvania
- SciTech High, in Harrisburg, Pennsylvania
- The Science Academy of South Texas, in Mercedes, Texas; also known as SciTech

== Other uses ==
- SciTech (conference), an American Institute of Aeronautics and Astronautics conference
- SciTech (magazine), a Serbian science magazine
- SciTech SNAP, an operating system

== See also ==
- Science
- Technology
