= QMF =

QMF can refer to:

- Quadrature mirror filter, a class of filters in digital signal processing
- Quadrupole mass filter, a type of mass spectrometer
- Quality management framework or quality management system
- Queensland Music Festival
- IBM Query Management Facility, a programming language
