= Richard Jensen =

Richard Jensen may refer to:

== Academics ==
- Richard L. Jensen (born 1943), American Mormon historian
- Richard A. Jensen (1934–2014), American theologian
- Richard J. Jensen (born 1941), American historian

== Businesspeople ==
- Richard Jensen (1909–1977), British co-founder of Jensen Motors
- Richard Jensen, American co-founder of Persistence Software
- Rick Jensen, publisher of The Daily Times

== Characters ==
- Dick Jensen, fictional campaign manager in the 1964 film The Best Man
- Richard Jensen, fictional character on 1960s TV series Peyton Place

== Others ==
- Richard Jensen (footballer) (born 1996), Finnish footballer
- Dick Jensen (1942–2006), American Hawaiian musician and born again evangelical Christian minister
- Dick Jensen, actor in the 1943 short film by the Three Stooges, Dizzy Detectives
- Rick Jensen, one of the winners in Season 2 of World Series of Blackjack
