= ClanLib =

Software development kit for video games

- Developer(s): The ClanLib developer
- Stable release: 4.2.0 / August 20, 2024; 10 months ago
- Repository: github.com/sphair/ClanLib
- Written in: C++
- Operating system: Microsoft Windows, Linux
- Type: SDK
- License: zlib license
- Website: github.com/sphair/ClanLib

ClanLib is a video game SDK, supporting Microsoft Windows, macOS, and Linux, with partial support for mobile platforms. It has full hardware accelerated graphics support through OpenGL, and also a software renderer. ClanLib also helps in playing sound, using the Vorbis or MikMod libraries, and has classes for collision detection, GUIs, XML, networking, and other things that may be helpful to a game programmer.

The earliest known public release is in 1999 (Version 0.1.18). Introduction to C++ Game Programming, published June 2007, dedicates a chapter to "Learn how to use the ClanLib library to make 2D games". Also Game Programming with Python, Lua, and Ruby, published December 2003, has a chapter about using ClanLib together with Ruby.

== See also ==
- Allegro
- Raylib
- SDL
- SFML
