= Jonathan I. Schwartz =

American businessman

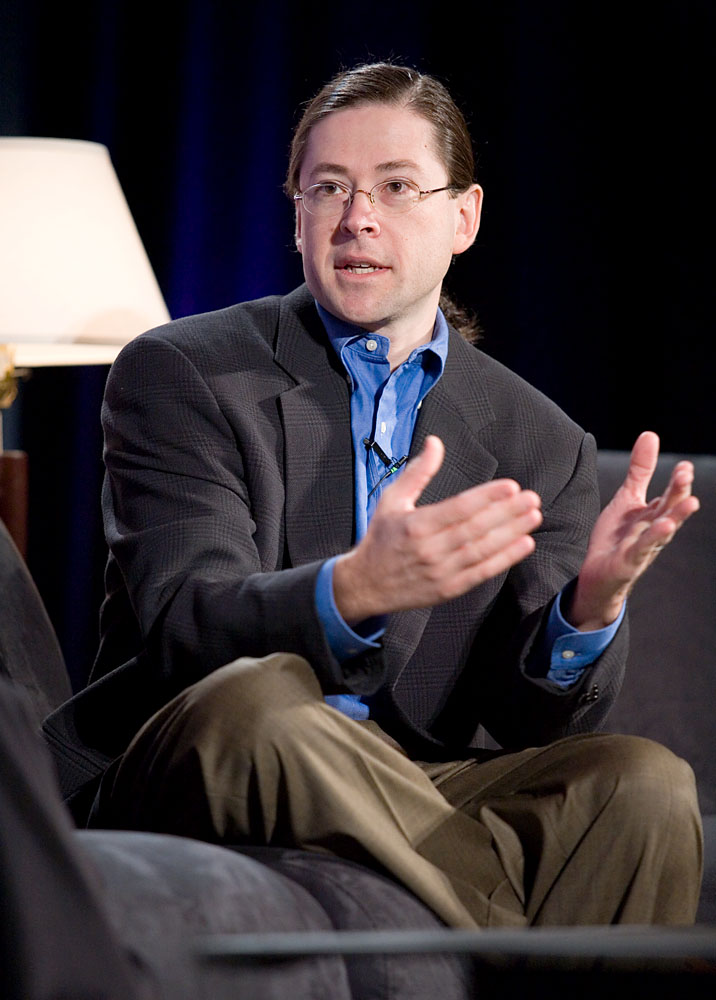
- Schwartz speaking at the 2005 Web 2.0 Conference in San Francisco, CA
- Born: October 20, 1965 (age 60); California, U.S.
- Education: Wesleyan University

Jonathan Ian Schwartz (born October 20, 1965) is an American businessman. He is president and CEO of CareZone, a firm intending to lower the price of prescription drugs for people with chronic illness.

Before founding CareZone, Schwartz had a nearly 15-year tenure with Sun Microsystems, culminating in being its CEO just prior to and during the company's battle for survival during the 2008 financial crisis, and its subsequent acquisition by Oracle.

He was also the founder and chief executive officer of Lighthouse Design, Ltd., a software company focused on the NeXTSTEP platform. Lighthouse was acquired by Sun in 1996.

== Background ==
Schwartz was born in Southern California, and spent much of his childhood moving between the West Coast and Washington, D.C., graduating in 1983 from Bethesda-Chevy Chase High School in Bethesda, Maryland. With aspirations of becoming an architect, in 1983 he entered college at Carnegie Mellon University, and subsequently transferred to Wesleyan University in 1984. At Wesleyan, he ran short of funds and was preparing to drop out, when a friend suggested he apply for a scholarship, the Gilbert Clee Scholarship. He was awarded the scholarship, which funded the remainder of his university expenses. He received dual degrees in mathematics and economics.

In 1987, Schwartz was nearly killed while riding on the Amtrak Colonial train that crashed in Chase, Maryland. He is cited in interviews as saying the incident had a profound impact on his life.

== Career ==
Schwartz started his career in 1987 at McKinsey & Company in New York City. In 1989, Schwartz left McKinsey and moved to Chevy Chase, Maryland, where he was a co-founder of Lighthouse Design, a company focused on building software for NeXT Computer, Inc. In the early 1990s, Lighthouse Design moved to San Mateo, California. Eventually, Schwartz became chief executive officer of Lighthouse.

In 1996, with NeXT failing in the marketplace and the internet beginning to explode globally, Lighthouse was acquired by Sun Microsystems.

He began his career at Sun working for Eric Schmidt, then the head of Sun Labs. After Schmidt's departure for Novell, Schwartz became the director of product marketing for JavaSoft in 1997 and then transitioned through a series of vice president positions. In 2004, Schwartz was promoted to president and chief operating officer of Sun. He eventually succeeded Scott McNealy as CEO in April 2006.

== As CEO of Sun ==
As CEO of Sun, he changed Sun's historically poor embrace of open source and freely distributed software, attempting to drive adoption, in particular, of Sun's operating system, Solaris. Sun's decision to abandon Solaris on Intel compatible x86 computers, he stated in subsequent interviews and blog postings, had undermined the hardware platforms on which Sun depended for revenue – hardware systems that ran only Sun's Solaris.

Sun's stock reached a high of $26.25 in 2007, a point just prior to which private equity investors KKR invested $750 million in a convertible debt financing. With nearly a third of its revenue derived from financial services companies, the 2008 financial crisis affected Sun especially hard. With large customers going bankrupt across the world, Schwartz began looking for a buyer for Sun.

Schwartz ultimately finalized an acquisition, signing an agreement for the sale of the company to Oracle Corporation on April 20, 2009. Oracle had been Sun's largest ISV, and the price of its database was typically a multiple of the price of the Sun hardware on which it ran. Thus, Oracle had the ability, by modifying its pricing, to determine which hardware vendors were chosen. After the acquisition, Oracle dropped the pricing of its database software on Sun hardware, in an attempt to boost its sales performance.

As CEO of Sun, Schwartz was known as one of the few Fortune 500 CEOs to use a blog for public communications. He also managed a public exchange with SEC Chairman Christopher Cox about the use of websites and blogs for the dissemination of financial information to meet Regulation Fair Disclosure.

== Post-Sun ==
On February 4, 2010, Schwartz resigned from his post as CEO of Sun. His resignation was a haiku on Twitter that read as follows: "Financial crisis/Stalled too many customers/CEO no more."

On August 12, 2010, Schwartz was named to Taleo Corporation's board of directors. On September 9, 2010, he announced that he was founding a new company, Picture of Health, which later became CareZone.

== CareZone ==
San Francisco-based CareZone officially launched February 15, 2012. CareZone enables users to create a password-protected, centralized repository of information related to the care of children, parents or other family and friends. Users can author journals, organize personal information, store documents, and share access to a controlled group of individuals. Schwartz said he started CareZone for people like himself who must simultaneously care for children and parents but find social networking sites to be inappropriate (owing to lax privacy or business models predicated on selling private information), and insufficiently targeted toward the act of caring for family members. Schwartz developed CareZone with Apple and Microsoft veteran Walter Smith.

== Ideology ==
Schwartz has been outspoken about technology as a social utility that creates an opportunity to drive economic, political and societal progress.

== Articles ==
- Markets set free by open source – Financial Times.com September 16, 2008 – Article discusses how the internet and open source allow people to participate directly in broadening economic opportunity, speeding social progress and driving market efficiency.
- Sun's 'Open'-Door Policy – eWeek March 15, 2008 – Article discusses how the company is leveraging open source to make new enterprise inroads.
- The 'Warrior' Within Jonathan Schwartz – Article discusses Schwartz' personal history and rise, accessed January 22, 2008
- Sun CEO Emerges From McNealy's Shadow. – San Francisco Chronicle. December 15, 2006. After 7 months as Sun's top executive, Schwartz says the company is expanding its business.
- Blogger in Chief – Fortune. October 30, 2006. Jonathan Schwartz discusses his communication priorities as Sun's CEO and the importance of his blog.
- Sun Promotes Alternate View – Techworld.com. April 11, 2005. Article where Schwartz felt the GPL was being used "as a tool allowing United States businesses to pillage developing countries of their intellectual property."

Preceded by Scott McNealy	CEO of Sun Microsystems; 2006 - 2010	Company acquired by Oracle Corporation
Preceded by Scott McNealy	President of Sun Microsystems; 2004 - 2010	Company acquired by Oracle Corporation
