= OS/2 =

Operating system from IBM

- OS/2 Warp 4 desktop. This version was released on September 25, 1996.
- Developer: IBM; Microsoft (1.0–1.3)
- Written in: C, C++ and assembly language
- Working state: Historical, now developed as ArcaOS
- Source model: Closed source
- Initial release: December 1987; 38 years ago
- Final release: 4.52 / December 2001; 24 years ago
- Marketing target: Professionals, servers
- Supported platforms: IA-32, PowerPC
- Kernel type: Hybrid kernel
- Influenced by: MS-DOS, IBM PC DOS
- Default user interface: Workplace Shell
- License: Proprietary
- Succeeded by: eComStation; ArcaOS
- Official website: OS/2 Warp (Archived)

Support status
- Unsupported as of December 2006

OS/2 (Operating System/2) is a discontinued proprietary computer operating system for x86 and PowerPC based personal computers created and initially developed jointly by IBM and Microsoft, under the leadership of IBM software designer Ed Iacobucci, intended as a replacement for DOS. The first version was released in 1987. A feud between the two companies beginning in 1990 led to Microsoft's leaving development solely to IBM, which continued development on its own. OS/2 Warp 4 in 1996 was the last major upgrade, after which IBM slowly halted the product as it failed to compete against Microsoft's Windows; updated versions of OS/2 were released by IBM until 2001.

The name stands for Operating System/2 because it was introduced as part of the same generation change release as IBM's Personal System/2 (PS/2) line of second-generation PCs. OS/2 was intended as a protected-mode successor of PC DOS targeting the Intel 80286 processor. Notably, basic system calls were modelled after MS-DOS calls; their names even started with "Dos" and it was possible to create "Family Mode" applications – text mode applications that could work on both systems. Because of this heritage, OS/2 shares similarities with Unix, Xenix, and Windows NT. OS/2 sales were largely concentrated in networked computing used by corporate professionals.

OS/2 2.0 was released in 1992 as the first 32-bit version as well as the first to be entirely developed by IBM, after Microsoft severed ties over a dispute over how to position OS/2 relative to Microsoft's new Windows 3.1 operating environment. With OS/2 Warp 3 in 1994, IBM attempted to also target home consumers through a multi-million dollar advertising campaign. Nonetheless, it continued to struggle in the marketplace, partly due to strategic business measures imposed by Microsoft in the industry that have been considered anti-competitive. Following the failure of IBM's Workplace OS project, OS/2 Warp 4 became the final major release in 1996; IBM discontinued its support for OS/2 on December 31, 2006. Since then, OS/2 has been developed, supported and sold by two different third-party vendors under license from IBM – first by Serenity Systems as eComStation from 2001 to 2011, and later by Arca Noae LLC as ArcaOS since 2017.

== Development ==
Ironically, Microsoft is competing against itself in the operating systems market. Besides Xenix, Microsoft has announced Windows 386, which [is] somewhat similar to OS/2. Of course, either way users turn, Microsoft wins.

— Computerworld, 1987

=== 1985–1990: Joint IBM–Microsoft development ===
Logo of OS/2 1.x

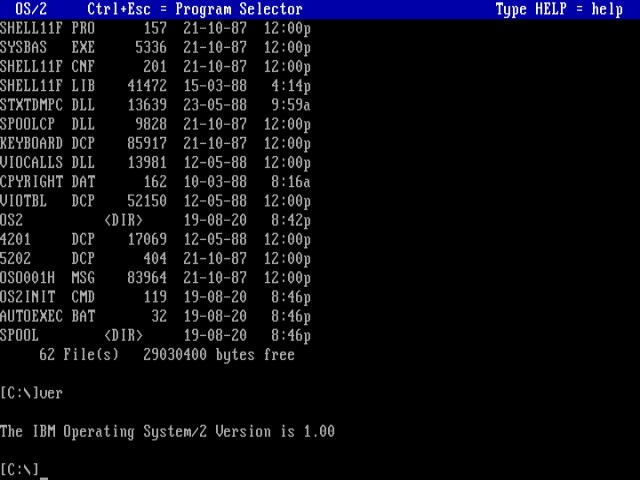
OS/2 1.0 featured a text-mode interface similar to MS-DOS.

The development of OS/2 began when IBM and Microsoft signed the "Joint Development Agreement" in August 1985. It was code-named "CP/DOS" and it took two years for the first product to be delivered.

==== OS/2 1.0 (1987) ====
OS/2's release was long delayed. It was widely believed that all IBM programmers used assembly language, and a rumour said that the delay was because they had to learn the programming language C. OS/2 1.0 was announced in April 1987 and released in December. The original release only ran in text mode, and a GUI was introduced with OS/2 1.1 about a year later. OS/2 features an API for controlling the video display (VIO) and handling keyboard and mouse events so that programmers writing for protected mode don't need to call the BIOS or access hardware directly. Other development tools included a subset of the video and keyboard APIs as linkable libraries so that family mode programs are able to run under MS-DOS, and, in the OS/2 Extended Edition v1.0, a database engine called Database Manager or DBM (this was related to DB2, and should not be confused with the DBM family of database engines for Unix and Unix-like operating systems). A task-switcher named Program Selector was available through the Ctrl-Esc hotkey combination, allowing the user to select among multitasked text-mode sessions (or screen groups; each can run multiple programs).

Communications and database-oriented extensions were delivered in 1988, as part of OS/2 1.0 Extended Edition: SNA, X.25/APPC/LU 6.2, LAN Manager, Query Manager, SQL.

Microsoft's Bill Gates predicted at a 1987 Computerworld interview that "three years out, over 80% of new office systems will be based on OS/2". Ashton-Tate's Ed Esber also predicted success, while Lotus Development's Jim Manzi said "I don't know anyone who's screaming for OS/2. End users would really prefer that the whole thing never happened". Gates said that Microsoft would release Windows software first with "very cheap upgrades" to OS/2 versions, while the other two said their companies would release for OS/2 first.

OS/2 1.1 was the first version to feature the Presentation Manager GUI.

==== OS/2 1.1 (1988) ====
The promised user interface, Presentation Manager, was introduced with OS/2 1.1 in October 1988. It had a similar user interface to Windows 2.1, which was released in May of that year. (The interface was replaced in versions 1.2 and 1.3 by a look closer in appearance to Windows 3.0.)

The Extended Edition of 1.1, sold only through IBM sales channels, introduced distributed database support to IBM database systems and SNA communications support to IBM mainframe networks.

==== OS/2 1.2 (1989) ====
In 1989, Version 1.2 introduced Installable Filesystems and, notably, the HPFS filesystem. HPFS provided a number of improvements over the older FAT file system, including long filenames and a form of alternate data streams called Extended Attributes. In addition, extended attributes were also added to the FAT file system.

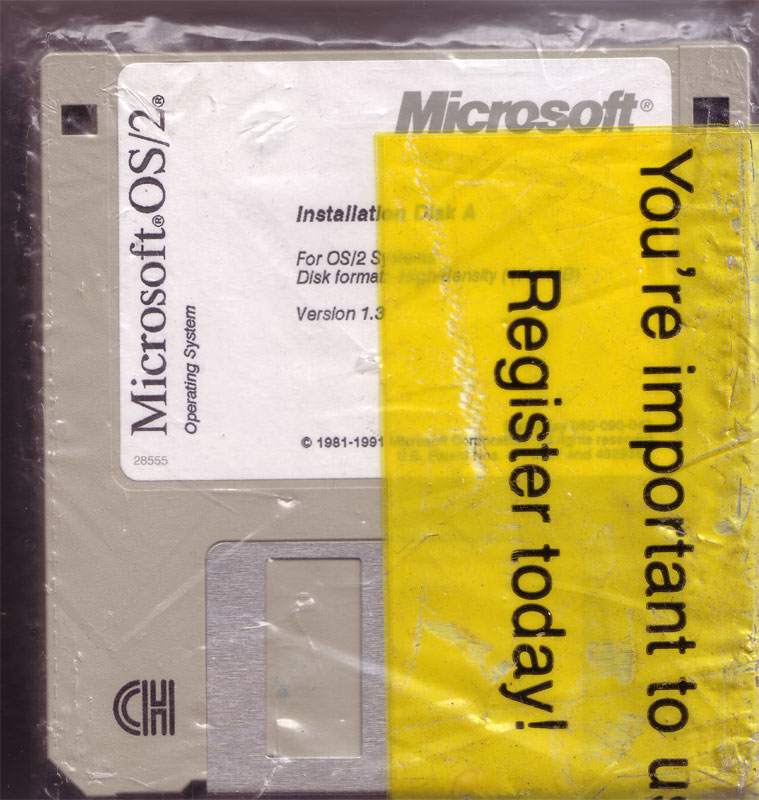
Installation Disk A of Microsoft OS/2 1.3 (3½-inch floppy disk)

The Extended Edition of 1.2 introduced TCP/IP and Ethernet support.

OS/2- and Windows-related books of the late 1980s from both Microsoft's Gordon Letwin and his IBM counterpart Ed Iacobucci acknowledged the existence of both systems and promoted OS/2 as the system of the future.

=== 1990: Breakup ===
==== OS/2 1.3 (1990) ====
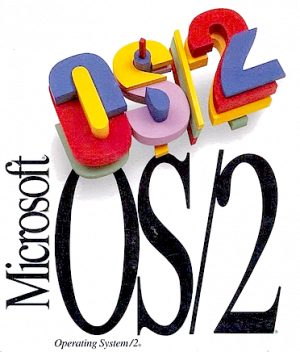
Logo of Microsoft's OS/2 until the breakup

The collaboration between IBM and Microsoft unravelled in 1990, between the releases of Windows 3.0 and OS/2 1.3. During this time, Windows 3.0 became a tremendous success, selling millions of copies in its first year. Much of its success was because Windows 3.0 (along with MS-DOS) was bundled with most new computers. OS/2, on the other hand, was available only as an additional stand-alone software package. In addition, OS/2 lacked device drivers for many common devices such as printers, particularly non-IBM hardware. Windows, on the other hand, supported a much larger variety of hardware. The increasing popularity of Windows prompted Microsoft to shift its development focus from cooperating on OS/2 with IBM to building its own business based on Windows.

Several technical and practical reasons contributed to this breakup. The two companies had significant differences in culture and vision. Microsoft favored the open hardware system approach that contributed to its success on the PC. IBM sought to use OS/2 to drive sales of its own hardware, and urged Microsoft to drop features, such as fonts, that IBM's hardware did not support. Microsoft programmers also became frustrated with IBM's bureaucracy and its use of lines of code to measure programmer productivity. IBM developers complained about the terseness and lack of comments in Microsoft's code, while Microsoft developers complained that IBM's code was bloated.

The two products have significant differences in API. OS/2 was announced when Windows 2.0 was near completion, and the Windows API already defined. IBM requested that this API be significantly changed for OS/2. Therefore, issues surrounding application compatibility appeared immediately. OS/2 designers hoped for source code conversion tools, allowing complete migration of Windows application source code to OS/2 at some point. Nonetheless, OS/2 1.x did not gain enough momentum to allow vendors to avoid developing for both OS/2 and Windows in parallel.

OS/2 1.3 was the final 16-bit only version of OS/2, and the last to be sold by Microsoft.

OS/2 1.x targets the Intel 80286 processor and DOS fundamentally does not. IBM insisted on supporting the 80286 processor, with its 16-bit segmented memory mode, because of commitments made to customers who had purchased many 80286-based PS/2s as a result of IBM's promises surrounding OS/2. Until release 2.0 in April 1992, OS/2 ran in 16-bit protected mode and therefore could not benefit from the Intel 80386's much simpler 32-bit flat memory model and virtual 8086 mode features. This was especially painful in providing support for DOS applications. While, in 1988, Windows/386 2.1 could run several cooperatively multitasked DOS applications, including expanded memory (EMS) emulation, OS/2 1.3, released in 1991, was still limited to one 640 kB "DOS box".

Given these issues, Microsoft started to work in parallel on a version of Windows that was more future oriented and portable. The hiring of Dave Cutler, former VAX/VMS architect, in 1988 created an immediate competition with the OS/2 team, as Cutler did not think much of the OS/2 technology and wanted to build on his work on the MICA project at Digital rather than creating a "DOS plus". His NT OS/2 was a completely new architecture.

IBM grew concerned about the delays in development of OS/2 2.0. Initially, the companies agreed that IBM would take over maintenance of OS/2 1.0 and development of OS/2 2.0, while Microsoft would continue development of OS/2 3.0. In the end, Microsoft decided to recast NT OS/2 3.0 as Windows NT, leaving all future OS/2 development to IBM. From a business perspective, it was logical to concentrate on a consumer line of operating systems based on DOS and Windows, and to prepare a new high-end system in such a way as to keep good compatibility with existing Windows applications. While it waited for this new high-end system to develop, Microsoft would still receive licensing money from Xenix and OS/2 sales. Windows NT's OS/2 heritage can be seen in its initial support for the HPFS filesystem, text mode OS/2 1.x applications, and OS/2 LAN Manager network support. Some early NT materials even included OS/2 copyright notices embedded in the software. One example of NT OS/2 1.x support is in the WIN2K resource kit. Windows NT versions from NT 3.1 until Windows 2000 could also run OS/2 1.x Presentation Manager and AVIO applications through the of addition the Windows NT Add-On Subsystem for Presentation Manager.

=== 1990–1996: Post-breakup ===
==== OS/2 2.0 (1992) ====
OS/2 2.0 was the first 32-bit release of OS/2, and the first to feature the Workplace Shell.

OS/2 2.0 was released in April 1992. At the time, the suggested retail price was US$195, while Windows retailed for $150.

OS/2 2.0 provided a 32-bit API for native programs, though the OS itself still contained some 16-bit code and drivers. It also included a new OOUI (object-oriented user interface) called the Workplace Shell. This was a fully object-oriented interface that was a significant departure from the previous GUI. Rather than merely providing an environment for program windows (such as the Program Manager), the Workplace Shell provided an environment in which the user could manage programs, files and devices by manipulating objects on the screen. With the Workplace Shell, everything in the system is an "object" to be manipulated.

OS/2 2.0 was touted by IBM as "a better DOS than DOS and a better Windows than Windows". It managed this by including the fully licensed MS-DOS 5.0, which had been patched and improved upon. For the first time, OS/2 was able to run more than one DOS application at a time. This was so effective that it allowed OS/2 to run a modified copy of Windows 3.0, itself a DOS extender, including Windows 3.0 applications.

Because of the limitations of the Intel 80286 processor, OS/2 1.x could run only one DOS program at a time, and did this in a way that allowed the DOS program to have total control over the computer. A problem in DOS mode could crash the entire computer. In contrast, OS/2 2.0 could leverage the virtual 8086 mode of the Intel 80386 processor to create a much safer virtual machine in which to run DOS programs. This included an extensive set of configuration options to optimize the performance and capabilities given to each DOS program. Any real-mode operating system (such as 8086 Xenix) could also be made to run using OS/2's virtual machine capabilities, subject to certain direct hardware access limitations.

The OS/2 2.0 upgrade box

Like most 32-bit environments, OS/2 could not run protected-mode DOS programs using the older VCPI interface, unlike the Standard mode of Windows 3.1; it only supported programs written according to DPMI. (Microsoft discouraged the use of VCPI under Windows 3.1, however, due to performance degradation.)

Unlike Windows NT, OS/2 always allowed DOS programs the possibility of masking real hardware interrupts, so any DOS program could deadlock the machine in this way. OS/2 could, however, use a hardware watchdog on selected machines (notably IBM machines) to break out of such a deadlock. Later, release 3.0 leveraged the enhancements of newer Intel 80486 and Intel Pentium processors—the Virtual Interrupt Flag (VIF), which was part of the Virtual Mode Extensions (VME)—to solve this problem.

To accommodate those who wanted to have multiple operating systems on their machine, Boot Manager was introduced that allowed for the creation of separate partitions on the boot drive that could be used to install different versions of DOS, Windows and OS/2 and give the user a choice of which partition to boot from.

==== OS/2 2.1 (1993) ====
OS/2 2.1 was released in 1993. This version of OS/2 achieved compatibility with Windows 3.0 (and later Windows 3.1) by adapting Windows user-mode code components to run inside a virtual DOS machine (VDM). Originally, a nearly complete version of Windows code was included with OS/2 itself: Windows 3.0 in OS/2 2.0, and Windows 3.1 in OS/2 2.1. Later, IBM developed versions of OS/2 that would use whatever Windows version the user had installed previously, patching it on the fly, and sparing the cost of an additional Windows license. It could either run full-screen, using its own set of video drivers, or "seamlessly," where Windows programs would appear directly on the OS/2 desktop. The process containing Windows was given fairly extensive access to hardware, especially video, and the result was that switching between a full-screen WinOS/2 session and the Workplace Shell could occasionally cause issues.

Because OS/2 only runs the user-mode system components of Windows, it is incompatible with Windows device drivers (VxDs) and applications that require them.

Multiple Windows applications run by default in a single Windows session – multitasking cooperatively and without memory protection – just as they would under native Windows 3.x. To achieve true isolation between Windows 3.x programs, however, OS/2 can also run multiple copies of Windows in parallel, with each copy residing in a separate VDM. The user can then optionally place each program either in its own Windows session – with preemptive multitasking and full memory protection between sessions, though not within them – or allow some applications to run together cooperatively in a shared Windows session while isolating other applications in one or more separate Windows sessions. At the cost of additional hardware resources, this approach can protect each program in any given Windows session (and each instance of Windows itself) from every other program running in any separate Windows session (though not from other programs running in the same Windows session).

Whether Windows applications are running in full-screen or windowed mode, and in one Windows session or several, it is possible to use DDE between OS/2 and Windows applications, and OLE between Windows applications only.

IBM's OS/2 for Windows product (codename Ferengi), also known as "OS/2, Special Edition", was interpreted as a deliberate strategy "of cashing in on the pervasive success of the Microsoft platform" but risked confusing consumers with the notion that the product was a mere accessory or utility running on Windows such as Norton Desktop for Windows when, in fact, it was "a complete, modern, multi-tasking, pre-emptive operating system", itself hosting Windows instead of running on it. Available on CD-ROM or 18 floppy disks, the product documentation reportedly suggested Windows as a prerequisite for installing the product, also being confined to its original FAT partition, whereas the product apparently supported the later installation of Windows running from an HPFS partition, particularly beneficial for users of larger hard drives. Windows compatibility, relying on patching specific memory locations, was reportedly broken by the release of Windows 3.11, prompting accusations of arbitrary changes to Windows in order to perpetrate "a deliberate act of Microsoft sabotage" against IBM's product.

==== OS/2 Warp 3 (1994) ====
Wordmark of OS/2 Warp 3.0

OS/2 Warp Connect 3.0, showing the Windows 3.1 Program Manager, QBASIC in a DOS window, and the LaunchPad (bottom center)

Released in 1994, OS/2 version 3.0 was labelled as OS/2 Warp to highlight the new performance benefits, and generally to freshen the product image. "Warp" had originally been the internal IBM name for the release: IBM claimed that it had used Star Trek terms as internal names for prior OS/2 releases, and that this one seemed appropriate for external use as well. At the launch of OS/2 Warp in 1994, Patrick Stewart was to be the Master of Ceremonies; Kate Mulgrew of the then-upcoming series Star Trek: Voyager substituted for him at the last minute.

OS/2 Warp offers a host of benefits over OS/2 2.1, notably broader hardware support, greater multimedia capabilities, Internet-compatible networking, and it includes a basic office application suite known as IBM Works. It was released in two versions: the less expensive "Red Spine" and the more expensive "Blue Spine" (named for the color of their boxes). "Red Spine" was designed to support Microsoft Windows applications by utilizing any existing installation of Windows on the computer's hard drive. "Blue Spine" includes Windows support in its own installation, and so can support Windows applications without a Windows installation. As most computers were sold with Microsoft Windows pre-installed and the price was less, "Red Spine" was the more popular product. OS/2 Warp Connect—which has full LAN client support built-in—followed in mid-1995. Warp Connect was nicknamed "Grape".

In OS/2 2.0, most performance-sensitive subsystems, including the graphics (Gre) and multimedia (MMPM/2) systems, were updated to 32-bit code in a fixpack, and included as part of OS/2 2.1. Warp 3 brought about a fully 32-bit windowing system, while Warp 4 introduced the object-oriented 32-bit GRADD display driver model.

==== Workplace OS (1995) ====
In 1991, IBM started development on an intended replacement for OS/2 called Workplace OS. This was an entirely new product, brand new code, that borrowed only a few sections of code from both the existing OS/2 and AIX products. It used an entirely new microkernel code base, intended (eventually) to host several of IBM's operating systems (including OS/2) as microkernel "personalities". It also included major new architectural features including a system registry, JFS, support for UNIX graphics libraries, and a new driver model.

Workplace OS was developed solely for POWER platforms, and IBM intended to market a full line of PowerPCs in an effort to take over the market from Intel. A mission was formed to create prototypes of these machines and they were disclosed to several corporate customers, all of whom raised issues with the idea of dropping Intel.

Advanced plans for the new code base would eventually include replacement of the OS/400 operating system by Workplace OS, as well as a microkernel product that would have been used in industries such as telecommunications and set-top television receivers.

A partially functional pre-alpha version of Workplace OS was demonstrated at Comdex, where a bemused Bill Gates stopped by the booth. The second and last time it would be shown in public was at an OS/2 user group in Phoenix, Arizona; the pre-alpha code refused to boot.

It was released in 1995. But with $990 million being spent per year on development of this as well as Workplace OS, and no possible profit or widespread adoption, the end of the entire Workplace OS and OS/2 product line was near.

==== OS/2 Warp 4 (1996) ====
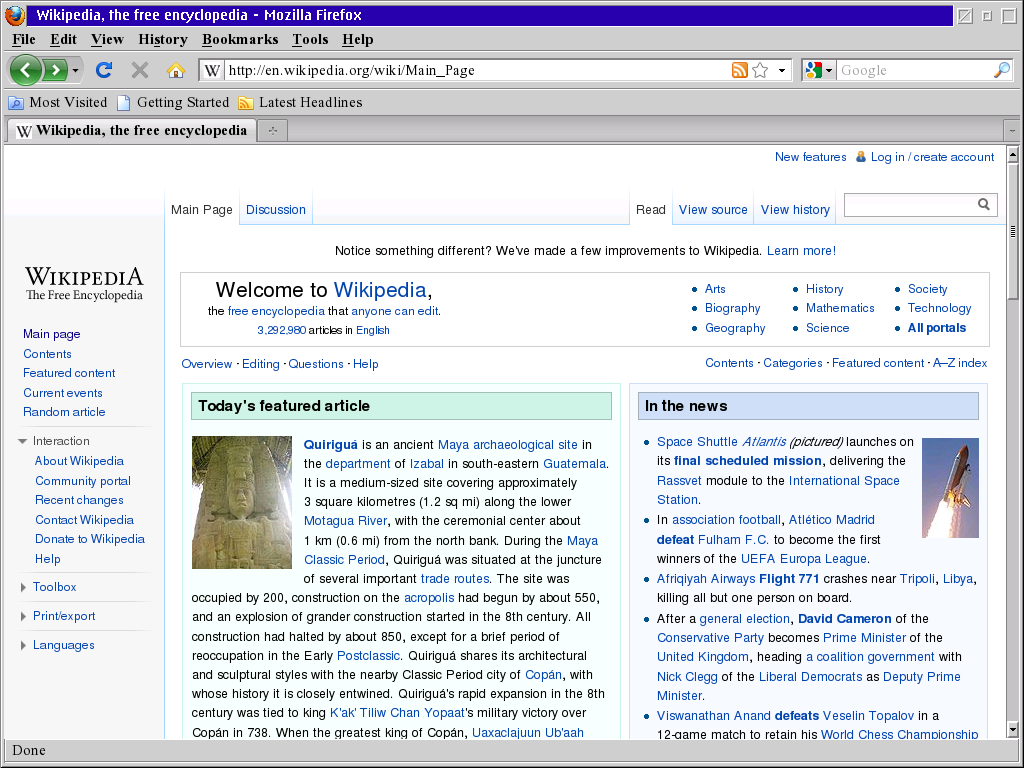
Firefox 3.5.4 for OS/2 Warp 4

Wordmark of OS/2 Warp 4

OS/2 Warp 4 desktop after installation

In 1996, Warp 4 added Java and speech recognition software. IBM also released server editions of Warp 3 and Warp 4 that bundled IBM LAN Server directly into the operating system installation. A personal version of Lotus Notes was also included, with a number of template databases for contact management, brainstorming, and so forth. The UK-distributed free demo CD-ROM of OS/2 Warp essentially contained the entire OS and was easily, even accidentally, cracked, meaning that even people who liked it did not have to buy it. This was seen as a backdoor tactic to increase the number of OS/2 users, in the belief that this would increase sales and demand for third-party applications, and thus strengthen OS/2's desktop numbers. This suggestion was bolstered by the fact that this demo version had replaced another that was not so easily cracked, but that had been released with trial versions of various applications. In 2000, the July edition of Australian Personal Computer magazine bundled software CD-ROMs, included a full version of Warp 4 that required no activation and was essentially a free release. Special versions of OS/2 2.11 and Warp 4 also included symmetric multiprocessing (SMP) support.

OS/2 sales were largely concentrated in networked computing used by corporate professionals; by the early 1990s, it was overtaken by Microsoft Windows NT. While OS/2 was arguably technically superior to Microsoft Windows 95, OS/2 failed to develop much penetration in the consumer and stand-alone desktop PC segments; there were reports that it could not be installed properly on IBM's own Aptiva series of home PCs. Microsoft made an offer in 1994 where IBM would receive the same terms as Compaq (the largest PC manufacturer at the time) for a license of Windows 95, if IBM ended development of OS/2 completely. IBM refused and instead went with an "IBM First" strategy of promoting OS/2 Warp and disparaging Windows, as IBM aimed to drive sales of its own software as well as hardware. By 1995, Windows 95 negotiations between IBM and Microsoft, which were already difficult, stalled when IBM purchased Lotus SmartSuite, which would have directly competed with Microsoft Office. As a result of the dispute, IBM signed the license agreement 15 minutes before Microsoft's Windows 95 launch event, which was later than their competitors and this badly hurt sales of IBM PCs. IBM officials later conceded that OS/2 would not have been a viable operating system to keep them in the PC business.

=== 1996–2001: Downsizing ===
A project was launched internally by IBM to evaluate the looming competitive situation with Microsoft Windows 95. Primary concerns included the major code quality issues in the existing OS/2 product (resulting in over 20 service packs, each requiring more diskettes than the original installation), and the ineffective and heavily matrixed development organization in Boca Raton (where the consultants reported that "basically, everybody reports to everybody") and Austin.

That study, tightly classified as "Registered Confidential" and printed only in numbered copies, identified untenable weaknesses and failures across the board in the Personal Systems Division as well as across IBM as a whole. This resulted in a decision being made at a level above the Division to cut over 95% of the overall budget for the entire product line, end all new development (including Workplace OS), eliminate the Boca Raton development lab, end all sales and marketing efforts of the product, and lay off over 1,300 development individuals (as well as sales and support personnel). $990 million had been spent in the last full year. Warp 4 became the last distributed version of OS/2.

=== 2001–2006: Discontinuation and end-of-life ===
Although a small and dedicated community remains faithful to OS/2, OS/2 failed to catch on in the mass market and is little used outside certain niches where IBM traditionally had a stronghold. For example, many bank installations, especially automated teller machines, run OS/2 with a customized user interface. Telecom companies such as Nortel used OS/2 in some voicemail systems. Also, OS/2 was used for the host PC used to control the Satellite Operations Support System equipment installed at NPR member stations from 1994 to 2007, and used to receive the network's programming via satellite.

Although IBM began indicating shortly after the release of Warp 4 that OS/2 would eventually be withdrawn, the company did not end support until December 31, 2006, with sales of OS/2 stopping on December 23, 2005. The latest IBM OS/2 Warp version is 4.52, which was released for both desktop and server systems in December 2001.

IBM is still delivering defect support for a fee. IBM urges customers to migrate their often highly complex applications to e-business technologies such as Java in a platform-neutral manner. Once application migration is completed, IBM recommends migration to a different operating system, suggesting Linux as an alternative.

=== 2001–present: Third-party development ===
ArcaOS is the most recent OS/2-based operating system developed outside of IBM.

After IBM discontinued development of OS/2, various third parties approached IBM to take over future development of the operating system. The OS/2 software vendor Stardock made such a proposal to IBM in 1999, but it was not followed through by the company. Serenity Systems succeeded in negotiating an agreement with IBM, and began reselling OS/2 as eComStation in 2001. eComStation is now sold by XEU.com, the most recent version (2.1) was released in 2011. In 2015, Arca Noae, LLC announced that they had secured an agreement with IBM to resell OS/2. They released the first version of their OS/2-based operating system in 2017 as ArcaOS. As of 2023, there have been multiple releases of ArcaOS, and it remains under active development.

==== Petitions for open source ====
Many people hoped that IBM would release OS/2 or a significant part of it as open source. Petitions were held in 2005 and 2007, but IBM refused them, citing legal and technical reasons. It is unlikely that the entire OS will be open at any point in the future because it contains third-party code to which IBM does not have copyright, and much of this code is from Microsoft. IBM also once engaged in a technology transfer with Commodore, licensing Amiga technology for OS/2 2.0 and above, in exchange for the REXX scripting language. This means that OS/2 may have some code that was not written by IBM, which can therefore prevent the OS from being re-announced as open-sourced in the future. On the other hand, IBM donated Object REXX for Windows and OS/2 to the Open Object REXX project maintained by the REXX Language Association on SourceForge.

There was a petition, arranged by OS2World, to open parts of the OS. Open source operating systems such as Linux have already profited from OS/2 indirectly through IBM's release of the improved JFS file system, which was ported from the OS/2 code base. As IBM didn't release the source of the OS/2 JFS driver, developers ported the Linux driver back to eComStation and added the functionality to boot from a JFS partition. This new JFS driver has been integrated into eComStation v2.0, and later into ArcaOS 5.0.

== Summary of releases ==
Release dates refer to the US English editions unless otherwise noted.

Date	Version
December 1987	OS/2 1.0
November 1988	OS/2 1.1
October 1989	OS/2 1.2
December 1990	OS/2 1.3
October 1991	OS/2 2.0 LA (Limited Availability)
April 1992	OS/2 2.0
October 1992	OS/2 2.00.1
May 1993	OS/2 2.1
November 1993	OS/2 for Windows
February 1994	OS/2 2.11
July 1994	OS/2 2.11 SMP
October 1994	OS/2 Warp 3
May 1995	OS/2 Warp Connect
December 1995	OS/2 Warp, PowerPC Edition
February 1996	OS/2 Warp Server 4
September 1996	OS/2 Warp 4
September 1996	OS/2 Warp Server Advanced SMP
November 1997	WorkSpace On-Demand 1.0
October 1998	WorkSpace On-Demand 2.0
April 1999	OS/2 Warp Server for e-Business (version 4.50)
November 2000	OS/2 Convenience Pack 1 (version 4.51)
November 2001	OS/2 Convenience Pack 2 (version 4.52)

== Features and technology ==
=== User interface ===
The graphic system has a layer named Presentation Manager that manages windows, fonts, and icons. This is similar in functionality to a non-networked version of X11 or the Windows GDI. On top of this lies the Workplace Shell (WPS) introduced in OS/2 2.0. WPS is an object-oriented shell allowing the user to perform traditional computing tasks such as accessing files, printers, launching legacy programs, and advanced object oriented tasks using built-in and third-party application objects that extended the shell in an integrated fashion not available on any other mainstream operating system. WPS follows IBM's Common User Access user interface standards.

WPS represents objects such as disks, folders, files, program objects, and printers using the System Object Model (SOM), which allows code to be shared among applications, possibly written in different programming languages. A distributed version called DSOM allowed objects on different computers to communicate. DSOM is based on CORBA. The object oriented aspect of SOM is similar to, and a direct competitor to, Microsoft's Component Object Model, though it is implemented in a radically different manner; for instance, one of the most notable differences between SOM and COM is SOM's support for inheritance (one of the most fundamental concepts of OO programming)—COM does not have such support. SOM and DSOM are no longer being developed.

The multimedia capabilities of OS/2 are accessible through Media Control Interface commands. The last update (bundled with the IBM version of Netscape Navigator plugins) added support for MPEG files. Support for newer formats such as PNG, progressive JPEG, DivX, Ogg, and MP3 comes from third parties. Sometimes it is integrated with the multimedia system, but in other offers it comes as standalone applications.

==== Commands ====
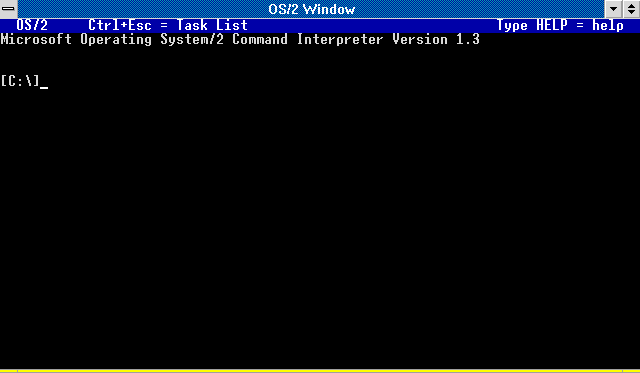
OS/2 Window (cmd.exe) on Microsoft OS/2 Version 1.3

The following list of commands is supported by cmd.exe on OS/2.

- ansi
- append
- assign
- attrib
- backup
- boot
- break
- cache
- call
- cd
- chcp
- chdir
- chkdsk
- cls
- cmd
- codepage
- command
- comp
- copy
- createdd
- date
- ddinstal
- debug
- del
- detach
- dir
- diskcomp
- diskcopy
- doskey
- dpath
- eautil
- echo
- endlocal
- erase
- exit
- extproc
- fdisk
- fdiskpm
- find
- for
- format
- fsaccess
- goto
- graftabl
- help
- if
- join
- keyb
- keys
- label
- makeini
- md
- mem
- mkdir
- mode
- more
- move
- patch
- path
- pause
- picview
- pmrexx
- print
- prompt
- pstat
- rd
- recover
- rem
- ren
- rename
- replace
- restore
- rmdir
- set
- setboot
- setcom40
- setlocal
- share
- shift
- sort
- spool
- start
- subst
- syslevel
- syslog
- time
- trace
- tracebuf
- tracefmt
- tree
- type
- undelete
- unpack
- ver
- verify
- view
- vmdisk
- vol
- xcopy

=== Networking ===
The TCP/IP stack is based on the open source BSD stack as visible with SCCS what compatible tools. IBM included tools such as ftp and telnet and even servers for both commands. IBM sold several networking extensions including NFS support and an X11 server.

Architecture of OS/2 Warp under x86

=== Drivers ===
Hardware vendors were reluctant to support device drivers for alternative operating systems including OS/2, leaving users with few choices from a select few vendors. To relieve this issue for video cards, IBM licensed a reduced version of the Scitech display drivers, allowing users to choose from a wide selection of cards supported through Scitech's modular driver design.

Document detailing OS/2's architecture

=== Virtualization ===
OS/2 has historically been more difficult to run in a virtual machine than most other legacy x86 operating systems because of its extensive reliance on the full set of features of the x86 CPU; in particular, OS/2's use of ring 2 prevented it from running in early versions of VMware. Newer versions of VMware provide official support for OS/2, specifically for eComStation.

VirtualPC from Microsoft (originally Connectix) has been able to run OS/2 without hardware virtualization support for many years. It also provided "additions" code that greatly improves host–guest OS interactions in OS/2. The additions are not provided with the current version of VirtualPC, but the version last included with a release may still be used with current releases. At one point, OS/2 was a supported host for VirtualPC in addition to a guest. Note that OS/2 runs only as a guest on those versions of VirtualPC that use virtualization (x86 based hosts) and not those doing full emulation (VirtualPC for Mac).

VirtualBox from Oracle Corporation (originally InnoTek, later Sun) supports OS/2 1.x, Warp 3 through 4.5, and eComStation as well as "Other OS/2" as guests. Nonetheless, attempting to run OS/2 and eComStation can still be difficult, if not impossible, because of the strict requirements of VT-x/AMD-V hardware-enabled virtualization and only ACP2/MCP2 is reported to work in a reliable manner.

ArcaOS supports being run as a virtual machine guest inside VirtualBox, VMware ESXi and VMWare Workstation. It ships with VirtualBox Guest Additions, and driver improvements to improve performance as a guest operating system.

The difficulties in efficiently running OS/2 have, at least once, created an opportunity for a new virtualization company. A large bank in Moscow needed a way to use OS/2 on newer hardware that OS/2 did not support. As virtualization software is an easy way around this, the company desired to run OS/2 under a hypervisor. Once it was determined that VMware was not a possibility, it hired a group of Russian software developers to write a host-based hypervisor that would officially support OS/2. Thus, the Parallels, Inc. company and their Parallels Workstation product was born.

=== Security niche ===
OS/2 has few native computer viruses; while it is not invulnerable by design, its reduced market share appears to have discouraged virus writers. There are, however, OS/2-based antivirus programs, dealing with DOS viruses and Windows viruses that could pass through an OS/2 server.

=== Problems ===
Some problems were classic subjects of comparison with other operating systems:

- Synchronous input queue (SIQ): if a GUI application was not servicing its window messages, the entire GUI system could get stuck and a reboot was required. This problem was considerably reduced with later Warp 3 fixpacks and refined by Warp 4, by taking control over the application after it had not responded for several seconds.
- No unified object handles (OS/2 v2.11 and earlier): The availability of threads probably led system designers to overlook mechanisms that allow a single thread to wait for different types of asynchronous events at the same time, for example the keyboard and the mouse in a "console" program. Even though select was added later, it only worked on network sockets. In case of a console program, dedicating a separate thread for waiting on each source of events made it difficult to properly release all the input devices before starting other programs in the same "session". As a result, console programs usually polled the keyboard and the mouse alternately, which resulted in wasted CPU and a characteristic "jerky" reactivity to user input. In OS/2 3.0 IBM introduced a new call for this specific problem.

== Historical uses ==
=== Banks ===
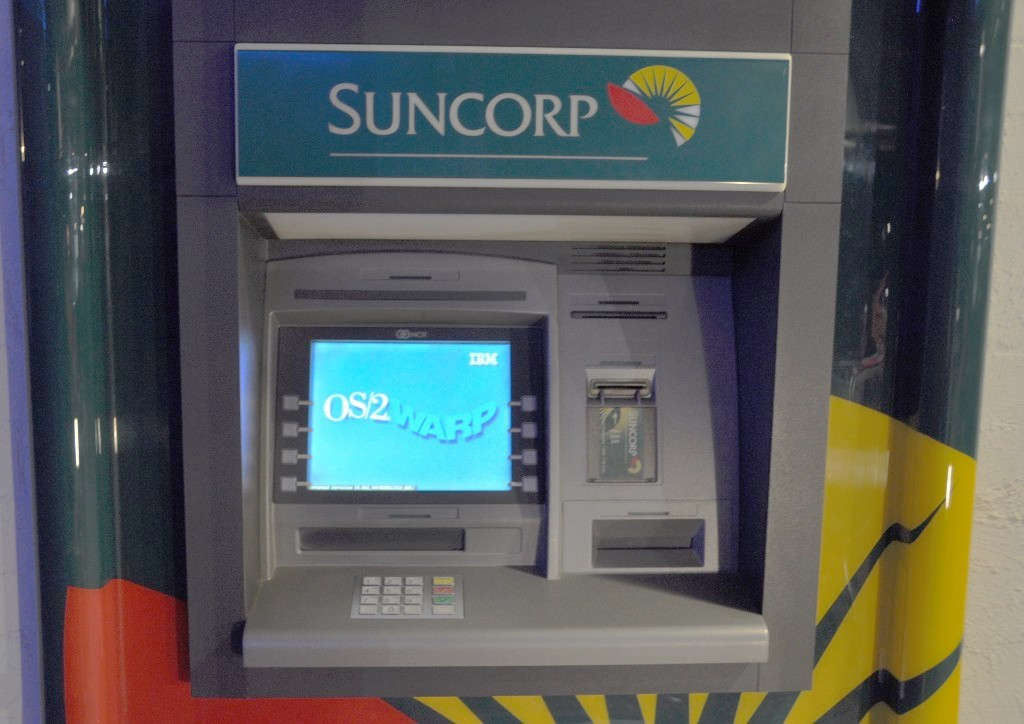
An ATM in Australia revealing during a reboot that it is based on OS/2 Warp

OS/2 has been used in the banking industry.

Suncorp bank in Australia still ran its ATM network on OS/2 as late as 2002. ATMs at Perisher Blue used OS/2 as late as 2009, and even the turn of the decade.

OS/2 was widely used by Brazilian banks. Banco do Brasil had a peak 10,000 machines running OS/2 Warp in the 1990s. OS/2 was used in automated teller machines until 2006. The workstations and automated teller machines and attendant computers have been migrated to Linux.

OS/2 has been widely used by Bank Saderat Iran in their teller machines, ATMs and local servers (over 35,000 working stations). As of 2011, the bank moved to virtualize and renew their infrastructure by moving OS/2 to Virtual Machines running over Windows.

OS/2 has been used by The Co-operative Bank in the UK for its domestic call centre staff, using a bespoke program created to access customer accounts that cannot easily be migrated to Windows.

=== Transport operators ===
OS/2 was used to control the SkyTrain automated light rail system in Vancouver, Canada until the late 2000s when it was replaced by Windows XP.

OS/2 was used by Trenitalia, both for the desktops at Ticket Counters and for the Automatic Ticket Counters up to 2011. Incidentally, the Automatic Ticket Counters with OS/2 were more reliable than the current ones running a flavor of Windows.

OS/2 was used in the London Underground Jubilee Line Extension Signals Control System (JLESCS) in London, England. This control system delivered by Alcatel was in use from 1999 to 2011 i.e. between abandonment before opening of the line's unimplemented original automatic train control system and the present SelTrac system. JLESCS did not provide automatic train operation only manual train supervision. Six OS/2 local site computers were distributed along the railway between Stratford and Westminster, the shunting tower at Stratford Market Depot, and several formed the central equipment located at Neasden Depot. It was once intended to cover the rest of the line between Green Park and Stanmore but this was never introduced.

OS/2 has been used on ticket machines for Tramlink in outer London.

OS/2 has been used in New York City's subway system for MetroCards. Rather than interfacing with the user, it connects simple computers and the mainframes. When NYC MTA finishes its transition to contactless payment, OS/2 will be removed.

OS/2 ran the faulty baggage handling system at Denver International Airport. The OS was eventually scrapped, but the software written for the system led to massive delays in the opening of the new airport. The OS itself was not at fault, but the software written to run on the OS was. The baggage handling system was eventually removed.

=== Retail ===
OS/2 has been used by the Stop & Shop supermarket chain (and has been installed in new stores as recently as March 2010).

OS/2 was used in checkout systems at Safeway supermarkets.

=== Other notable users ===
OS/2 was widely adopted by accounting professionals and auditing companies. In mid-1990s native 32-bit accounting software were well developed and serving corporate markets.

OS/2 was used as the main operating system for Abbey National General Insurance motor and home direct call centre products using the PMSC Series III insurance platform on DB2.2 from 1996 to 2001.

OS/2 was used as part of the Satellite Operations Support System (SOSS) for NPR's Public Radio Satellite System. SOSS was a computer-controlled system using OS/2 that NPR member stations used to receive programming feeds via satellite. SOSS was introduced in 1994 using OS/2 3.0, and was retired in 2007, when NPR switched over to its successor, the ContentDepot.

OS/2 was used by radio personality Howard Stern. He once had a 10-minute on-air rant about OS/2 versus Windows 95 and recommended OS/2. He also used OS/2 on his IBM 760CD laptop.

== Awards ==
BYTE in 1989 listed OS/2 as among the "Excellence" winners of the BYTE Awards, stating that it "is today where the Macintosh was in 1984: It's a development platform in search of developers". The magazine predicted that "When it's complete and bug-free, when it can really use the 80386, and when more desktops sport OS/2-capable PCs, OS/2 will—deservedly—supersede DOS. But even as it stands, OS/2 is a milestone product".

In March 1995 OS/2 won seven awards

- InfoWorld Product of the Year.
- Five Awards at CeBIT.
  - PC Professional Magazine - Innovation of the Year award.
  - CHIP Magazine named OS/2 Warp the Operating System of the Year.
  - DOS International named OS/2 Warp the Operating System of the Year.
  - 1+1 Magazine awarded it with the Software Marketing Quality award.
  - Industrie Forum awarded it with its Design Excellence.
- SPA Best Business Software Award.

== IBM products using OS/2 ==
IBM has used OS/2 in a wide variety of hardware products, effectively as a form of embedded operating system.

Product	Product type	Usage of OS/2
IBM 2074	Console support controller	Used to connect 3270 sessions to host via ESCON channels. Introduced in September 2000 as a replacement for local, non-SNA 3174 Control Units. All models were withdrawn in 2006 and replaced by the Open System Adapter Integrated Console Controller (OSA ICC).
IBM 3494	Tape library	Used as the operating system for the Library Manager (LM) that controlled the tape accessor (robot)
IBM 3745	Communications controller	Used as the operating system for the Service Processor (SP) and if installed, the Network Node Processor (NNP).
IBM 3890	Document processor	The 3890/XP1 was announced November 12, 1988. It initially used OS/2 1.1 Extended Edition on a PS/2 Model 80 to emulate the stacker control software that previously ran on a System/360. IBM later switched to OS/2 Warp.
IBM 473x	ATM	Used in a range of automatic teller machines manufactured by IBM. Was also used in later 478x ATMs manufactured with Diebold.
IBM 9672	IBM mainframe	Used as the operating system for the Hardware Management Console (HMC) and Support Element (SE). Was also used in later mainframe models such as the IBM 2064.

== See also ==
- History of the graphical user interface
- Multiple Virtual DOS Machine (MVDM) – OS/2 virtual DOS machine and seamless Windows integration
- OpenDoc – Software standard
- System Object Model – Programming framework
- Team OS/2
- Windows Libraries for OS/2
- LAN Manager
