= Team OS/2 =

Operating system advocacy group

Team OS/2 was a crowd-sourced advocacy group formed to promote IBM's OS/2 operating system. Originally internal to IBM with no formal IBM support, Team OS/2 successfully converted to a grassroots movement formally supported (but not directed) by IBM - consisting of well over ten thousand OS/2 enthusiasts both within and without IBM. It is one of the earliest examples of both an online viral phenomenon and a cause attracting supporters primarily through online communications.

The decline of Team OS/2 largely coincided with IBM's abandonment of OS/2 and the coinciding attacks orchestrated by Microsoft on OS/2, Team OS/2, and IBM's early attempts at online evangelism.

== History ==
=== Beginnings ===
Team OS/2 was a significant factor in the spread and acceptance of OS/2. Formed in February 1992, Team OS/2 began when IBM employee Dave Whittle, recently appointed by IBM to evangelize OS/2 online, formed an internal IBM discussion group titled TEAMOS2 FORUM on IBM's worldwide network, which at the time, served more individuals than any other commercial worldwide network.

The forum header stated that its purpose was

for the discussion of those things that empowered IBMers, working as a team, can do to promote the success of OS/2, focused on synergy and combining talents to achieve results greater than the sum of individual efforts through teamwork.

— David B. Whittle

The forum went viral as increasing numbers of IBMers worldwide began to contribute a wide variety of ideas as to how IBM could effectively compete with Microsoft to establish OS/2 as the industry standard desktop operating system. Within a short time, thousands of IBM employees had added the words TEAMOS2 to their internet phone directory listing, which enabled anyone within IBM to find like-minded OS/2 enthusiasts within the company and work together to overcome the challenges posed by IBM's size, insularity, and top-down marketing style. TEAMOS2 FORUM quickly caught the attention of some IBM executives, including Lee Reiswig and Lucy Baney, who after initial scepticism, offered moral and financial support for Whittle's grass roots and online marketing efforts. IBM's official program for generating word-of-mouth enthusiasm was called the "OS/2 Ambassador Program", where OS/2 enthusiasts company-wide could win Gold, Silver, and Bronze Ambassador pins and corporate recognition with various levels of structured achievement. Both the OS/2 Ambassador Program and Team OS/2 were effective in evangelizing OS/2 within IBM, but only Team OS/2 was effective in generating support for the promotion of OS/2 outside of IBM.

=== Externalization ===
Whittle began to extend the Team OS/2 effort outside of IBM with various posts on CompuServe, Prodigy, bulletin boards, newsgroups, and other venues. He also made a proposal to IBM executives, which they eventually implemented when IBM Personal Software Products moved to Austin, Texas, that they form a "Grass Roots Marketing Department".

Team OS/2 went external that spring, when the first Team OS/2 Party was held in Chicago. The IBM Marketing Office in Chicago created a huge banner visible from the streets. Microsoft reacted when Steve Ballmer roamed the floor with an application on diskette that had been specially programmed to crash OS/2; and OS/2 enthusiasts gathered for an evening of excitement at the first Team OS/2 party. Tickets were limited to those who had requested them on one of the online discussion groups. Attendees were asked to nominate their favorite "Teamer" for the "Team OS/2 Hall of Fame", and those whose names were drawn came forward to tell the story of their nominee - what sacrifice they had made to promote OS/2 and why they were deserving of recognition. Prizes included limousine rides that evening. At the end, all attendees received the first TEAM OS/2 T-shirt, which includes the first Team OS/2 logo on the front and the distinctive IBM blue-stripe logo on the back - except with lower-case letters: "ibm/2" to represent the new IBM. Even the lead singer in the band Chicago that had provided music for the event asked if they could have a T-shirt for each member of the band. One IBM executive in attendance said it was the first IBM event that had given him goosebumps.

After that, word about the Team OS/2 phenomenon spread even more quickly, both within IBM and without. OS/2 enthusiasts spread the word to computer user groups across the United States, then eventually worldwide, independently of IBM marketing efforts. Whittle established multiple localized forums within IBM, such as TEAMNY, TEAMDC, TEAMFL, TEAMTX, and TEAMCA, which attracted new supporters and enabled enthusiastic followers to share ideas and success stories, plan events, and creatively apply what they were learning from one another.

The "Teamer Invasion" of COMDEX in the Fall of 1993 was perhaps the high water mark for Team OS/2. COMDEX was, at that time, the most important computer and electronics trade show, held in Las Vegas. Wearing the salmon-colored shirts which were to become associated with Team OS/2, the group's members, led by Doug Azzarito, Keith Wood, Mike Kogan, IBM User Group Manager Gene Barlow, and others wandered the convention floors, promoting OS/2 and providing demo discs to vendors and offering to install the distributed version of OS/2 on display computers. Many Team OS/2 volunteers had traveled to the convention on their own, including some from overseas; so their independence and grass-roots enthusiasm attracted significant attention in the media and amongst exhibitors.

What little funding IBM provided went to provide the shirts, "trinkets and trash", and an onsite headquarters for Teamers to coordinate their efforts and collect items to give to vendors. IBM had established the Grass Roots Marketing department proposed earlier, and had even tapped Vicci Conway and Janet Gobeille to provide support and guidance for Team OS/2 with Whittle voluntarily stepping aside from his previous day-to-day focus on supporting and monitoring Team OS/2 activities. Janet was nicknamed "Team Godmother", but everyone in IBM, especially Whittle, was wary of trying to direct volunteers or make Team OS/2 too structured or formal, in order to avoid "breaking something that works".

According to the Team OS/2 Frequently Asked Questions document, Team OS/2 at one point had a presence (sponsoring members willing to publish their e-mail addresses as points of contact) in Argentina, Australia, Austria, Belgium, Canada, Denmark, Germany, Ireland, Japan, Latvia, the Netherlands, Portugal, Singapore, South Africa, Spain, Sweden, Switzerland, and the United Kingdom; as well as online on America Online, CompuServe, Delphi, FidoNet, Genie, the Internet/Usenet/mail servers, Prodigy, and WWIVNet.

=== Analysis ===
In an article analyzing Team OS/2 and its meaning and context, Robert L. Scheier listed several of the factors that led to the success of the group. These included the creation of a strong group identity with a powerful name, corporate support without corporate direction, the ability of volunteer members to do things that companies couldn't do, keeping it "loose" and relatively unstructured, providing lots of smaller material rewards without compensation, and listening to team members as if they were the "eyes and ears of the public."

However, Team OS/2's very lack of structure left it vulnerable. Various journalists have documented a "dirty tricks" campaign by Microsoft. Online, numerous individuals (nicknamed "Microsoft Munchkins" by John C. Dvorak) used pseudonyms to attack OS/2 and manipulate online discussions. Whittle was the target of a widespread online character assassination campaign.

Some journalists who were less than enthusiastic about OS/2 received death threats and other nasty emails from numerous sources, identified in taglines as "Team OS/2" without a name. Whether this attack pattern was part of Microsoft's efforts or from Team OS/2, the identity was never proven. Ultimately, at least some of Microsoft's efforts were exposed on Will Zachmann's Canopus forum on CompuServe, where the owner of one particular account, ostensibly belonging to "Steve Barkto", (who had been attacking OS/2, David Barnes, Whittle, and other OS/2 fans) was discovered to be funded by the credit card of Rick Segal, a high-level Microsoft employee and evangelist, who had also been active in the forums. James Fallows, a nationally renowned journalist, weighed in to state that the stylistic fingerprint found in the Barkto posts were almost certainly a match with the stylistic fingerprints in the Microsoft evangelist's postings. Will Zachmann sent an open letter to Steve Ballmer, futilely demanding a public investigation into the business practices of the publicly traded Microsoft.

=== Decline ===
At the height of the marketing effort, Team OS/2 consisted of more than ten thousand known members, and countless undocumented members. IBM acknowledged publicly that without Team OS/2, there might not have been a fourth generation ("Warp 4") of the operating system. However, the IBM Marketing Director over the Grass Roots Marketing Department made the decision to meet his headcount cut targets by eliminating the entire department - one week before the 1995 Fall Comdex. Microsoft executives were said to be positively gleeful and Team OS/2 members worldwide were said to be incredulous.

Within months, Whittle and Barlow had left IBM, Conway and Gobeille were reassigned within IBM, and Teamers were crushed by IBM's announcement that the marketing of individual desktop versions would come to a close. Most Team members eventually migrated away from OS/2 to Linux, which offered the power and stability which they had come to expect from OS/2, and where much of what was learned with Team OS/2 inspired at least some in the Linux and Open Source movements.

== Legacy ==
When Microsoft was readying the first version of Windows NT (designated "Version 3.1") in 1993, a Texas computer user group (HAL-PC) invited IBM and Microsoft to a public "shootout" between the two operating systems. Videotape of the two demonstrations was later distributed by IBM and Team OS/2 members. Compared to the dynamic presentation given by David Barnes as he put OS/2 through its paces, the Microsoft presenter and NT showed so poorly that Microsoft demanded that all portions of the NT presentation be cut out of the videotapes which IBM was distributing of the event. This resulted in issuance of an edited version of the tape, but hundreds of original (complete) copies had already been released. The uncut version of the "OS/2 - NT Shootout" tape have been dubbed the "OS/2 - NT Shootdown" or "The Shootdown of Flight 31". The tape has been used to train professional software and hardware presenters who might face user groups.

Ultimately, following the abandonment of OS/2 by IBM, an immeasurable but nonetheless significant portion of the movement generated by Team OS/2 migrated to the Open Source movement, specifically to the support of Linux; and IBM itself eventually chose to support Linux as its platform of choice for its software solutions initiatives.
