= Persistence Software =

American Software Company (1991-2004)

- Type: Public
- Industry: Software
- Founded: 1991; 35 years ago in San Mateo, California, United States
- Founders: Derek Henninger; Christopher Keene; Richard Jensen
- Defunct: 2004
- Fate: Acquired by Progress Software

Persistence Software was an American software company that operated from 1991 to 2004. Persistence was based in San Mateo, California, founded in 1991 by Derek Henninger, Christopher Keene, and Richard Jensen, and developed software for object-relational mapping. In 1999, Persistence Software went public on NASDAQ under the ticker symbol PRSW. In 2004, Progress Software bought Persistence.

== History ==
Persistence Software was founded in 1991 by Derek Henninger, Christopher Keene, and Richard Jensen in San Mateo, California.

The company started life as a spinoff from Lighthouse Design. As the original NeXTSTEP computer shipped with a relational database and Objective-C, Lighthouse engineers created a simple mapping utility called Exploder to store objects in a relational database.

The Persistence team worked with Stanford University's professors Gio Wiederhold and Arthur M Keller, who was the chief technical advisor, to extend the object-relational mapping technology by adding the concepts of mapping related objects.

Persistence created a series of products that integrated object-to-relational mapping, caching, and cache synchronization with automated cache management. The products were marketed under the names PowerTier, EdgExtend, and DirectAlert.

Sun Microsystems licensed the Persistence technology in 1998, which was later incorporated into the Enterprise JavaBeans standard.

In 2004, Progress Software bought Persistence for $16 million.
