= UniVBE =

Software driver

UniVBE (short for Universal VESA BIOS Extensions) is a software driver that allows DOS applications written to the VESA BIOS standard to run on almost any display device from around 1990 through the mid-2000s.

The UniVBE driver was written by SciTech Software and is also available in their product called SciTech Display Doctor.

The primary benefit is increased compatibility and performance with games. Many video cards have sub-par implementations of the VESA standards, or no support at all. UNIVBE replaces the card's built-in support. Many games include a version of UNIVBE because VESA issues were so widespread.

According to SciTech Software Inc, SciTech Display Doctor is licensed by IBM as the native graphics driver solution for OS/2.

== History ==
The software started out as The Universal VESA TSR (UNIVESA), written by Kendall Bennett. It was renamed to Universal VESA BIOS Extensions (UniVBE) in version 4.2 at the request of VESA organisation, and is no longer freeware.

In version 5.1, VBE/Core 2.0 support was added.

In version 5.2, it was renamed to Scitech Display Doctor. However, UniVBE continued to be the name used for the actual driver.

Version 6 included support of VBE/Core 3.0, VBE/SCI.

Version 6.5 introduced the ability to use Scitech Display Doctor as wrapper video driver.

Version 7 supports VESA/MCCS and included Scitech GLDirect, an OpenGL emulator. This version was also ported to OS/2 and Linux (as version 1.0). However, the proposed product was never widely available. Only pre-releases were available to the public. In the Windows SDD prerelease, it included DOS UniVBE driver 7.20 beta, the Scitech Nucleus Graphics driver, GLDirect 2.0 and 3.0 beta. SDD 7 was first released on OS/2 on February 28, 2002, followed by a Windows beta on March 1, 2002.

SciTech Display Doctor 7.1 marked the final release of SDD, which was available on OS/2, among other operating systems. However, the Scitech Nucleus Graphics engine lived on as SciTech SNAP (System Neutral Access Protocol) Graphics, SciTech SNAP DDC, and SciTech VBE Test Suite 8.0. Unlike UniVBE, SciTech SNAP Graphics is designed as fully-accelerated binary-compatible graphic device driver, rather than patching a GPU BIOS to be VESA-compliant.

Display Doctor is no longer supported by SciTech Software. SciTech Display Doctor 5.3a, SciTech Display Doctor 6.53, and UniVBE 6.7 were available on their FTP site, but as of 4 October 2009, the FTP site is no longer available; this seems to be related to the acquisition of SciTech Software by Alt Richmond Inc. in December 2008.

One attempt to provide an alternative to SciTech's products was FreeBE/AF, but the last release was on 27 June 1999.

== Compatibility ==
UniVBE requires a video card with at least 512 KB of memory.

Although UniVBE has supported many controllers, the quality of VESA support decayed in newer incarnations, especially for owners with older hardware. In the case of newer GPUs, the video cards that use them have begun to incorporate rewritable firmware, which allows video card manufacturers to offer better VBE patches than SciTech can supply, especially for cards using Matrox processors.

UniVBE does not add 16-colour screen modes or text modes, but offers an option to reuse those modes with a "pass through feature". However, the text mode pass through feature has been broken since the release of SDD 6.

Matrox G-series video cards can only use video modes that utilize at most half of its memory. This is different from the Matrox Millennium, which was documented by SciTech as a hardware flaw.
