= SciTech SNAP =

32/64-bit operating system

SciTech SNAP (System Neutral Access Protocol) is an operating system portable, dynamically loadable, native-size 32-bit/64-bit device driver architecture. SciTech SNAP defines the architecture for loading an operating system neutral binary device driver for any type of hardware device, be it a graphics controller, audio controller, SCSI controller or network controller. SciTech SNAP drivers are source code portable between different microprocessor platforms, and the binary drivers are operating system portable within a particular microprocessor family.

SNAP drivers were originally developed for Intel 386+ CPU with any 32-bit operating system or environment supported on that CPU. With the introduction of SNAP 3.0, native binary SNAP drivers are available for 32-bit PowerPC CPUs and 64-bit x86-64 CPUs.

On 27 August 2002, SciTech Software, Inc. announced the intention to release the Scitech SNAP driver development kit.

On 16 November 2006, SciTech Software, Inc. announced that it has ceased further development of its SNAP device driver technology in favor of a new line of web and business logic technologies. SciTech also announced that it would begin looking for a buyer for SciTech SNAP.

In December 2008 Alt Richmond Inc. closed the acquisition of SciTech Software's SNAP technology. The plans of SciTech Software in 2008 to create OpenSNAP, an open source version of the driver technology, are therefore no longer an option unless Alt Richmond decides to pick this up.

In May 2015, Arca Noae, LLC announced that they have reached an agreement with Alt Richmond, Inc. to license the source code for SNAP Graphics for OS/2.

== Relationship with Scitech Display Doctor ==
SciTech Display Doctor 6.5 included a replacement video driver for Windows 95 or higher, which works with any hardware supported by SDD. In SDD 7, the driver was renamed to Scitech Nucleus Graphics driver. The Nucleus Graphics driver was later incorporated into SciTech SNAP Graphics. In SNAP 3, Nucleus was renamed to SNAP.

SciTech SNAP Graphics version 2 also included VBETest/Lite - VESA BIOS Extensions (VBE) Compliance Test version 8.00. It was later removed in SciTech SNAP Graphics 3.

In SciTech SNAP 3 for DOS, most of the OpenGL tests from SciTech Display Doctor 7 beta can be found in GACtrl Driver Control Center.

The Windows version of Scitech SNAP Graphics maintained the user interface found in SDD 7 beta.

== SciTech SNAP Graphics ==
It is the first product for the SciTech SNAP line, which provides accelerated graphics.

SciTech SNAP Graphics has been ported to DOS, OS/2, Microsoft Windows (CE, NT, 2000, XP), QNX, SMX (the SunOS/Solaris port of MINIX), Linux, On Time RTOS-32, Unununium OS operating systems. Supported hardware included video processors from 3dfx, 3Dlabs, Alliance Semiconductor, AMD (Geode GX2), ARK Logic, ATI, Chips & Technologies, Cirrus Logic, Cyrix, IBM, InteGraphics, Intel, Matrox, NeoMagic, Number Nine, NVIDIA, Oak, Philips, Rendition, S3, Sigma Designs, Silicon Motion, SiS, Tseng Labs, Trident, VIA, Weitek, as well as any video card supporting VBE 1.2 or higher.

Although SciTech SNAP Graphics does not offer standalone VBE driver, SNAP driver accelerates applications using VBE calls via SciTech SNAP Graphics driver. SNAP Graphics for Windows can also accelerate VBE 3 calls, if DOS programs is run in Windows DOS box.

SciTech was opened up in 2020.

=== Spin-off products ===
- SciTech SNAP Graphics ENT
- SciTech SNAP Graphics ENT/BC with DPVL support (SciTech SNAP Graphics VESA DPVL)
- SciTech SNAP Graphics IES

=== Personal Edition ===
SciTech also offer SciTech SNAP Graphics "PE" (Personal Edition) under the My SciTech site, which allows registered users to download a SNAP driver of hardware and operating system specified by users. Each user account can download two drivers per week. The driver generated by the service can be run for six months.

In Scitech SNAP Graphics PE, tools GACtrl, GAMode, GAOption, GAPerf DOS tools are included. The GLDirect tests are not included in Windows driver.

== SciTech SNAP Audio ==
Similar to Scitech SNAP Graphics, it provides OS-independent audio drivers. It has been ported to Windows NT 4.0. Supported hardware include AC'97 and Intel HDA, but HDA does not support modem function.

== SciTech SNAP DDC ==
It is designed to provide easy access to an attached display in order to program it directly via I²C or simply to read the monitor's EDID record.

== See also ==
- Allegro (software library)
