= SciTech Software =

Former software company (1996-2008)

SciTech Software, Inc.
- Type: Private
- Industry: Technology
- Founded: 1996; 30 years ago in Chico, California, United States
- Founder: Kendall Bennett
- Defunct: 2008
- Fate: Acquired by Alt Richmond Inc.
- Successor: Alt Richmond Inc. (later dissolved in 2020)
- Products: Software

SciTech Software, Inc. was a privately held software company based in Chico, California.

Founded by Kendall Bennett in 1996, SciTech Software developed many popular graphics device driver programs for the PC, ranging from UniVESA (later renamed to UniVBE) to SciTech Display Doctor and SciTech SNAP Graphics and SciTech SNAP Audio.

It was purchased by Alt Richmond in 2008. Later in 2020, Alt Richmond was dissolved.
