= IBM Query Management Facility =

IBM Db2 Query Management Facility (QMF) for z/OS is business analytics software developed by IBM. It was originally created to be the reporting interface for the IBM Db2 for z/OS database and is used to generate reports for business decisions. In its inception QMF's reports were "green-screen" reports that could be accessed online. QMF handles data not just from Db2 for z/OS, but also other structured and unstructured data sources such as Oracle, Teradata, Adabas, Hadoop, and webpages. Its dashboards and reports can be deployed via a workstation GUI, a browser, or a tablet or can be embedded within applications. This technology is extremely outdated. With application development passed to a team in India, meaningful updates is non existent. QMF Vision has difficulty working with volumes of data larger thank 100k rows. The QMF dashboards are worse than QMF Vision and issues are encountered with 50k rows. With minimal investment and both IBM and Rocket Software relying on licensing revenue this product is being sun setted.

== External websites ==
- Official IBM site
