= Replacement algorithm =

Replacement algorithm may refer to:

- Cache replacement algorithm
  - Page replacement algorithm
