= Identity map pattern =

Database access design pattern

In database design, the identity map pattern is a database access design pattern used to improve performance by providing a context-specific, in-memory cache to prevent duplicate retrieval of the same object data from the database.

If the requested data has already been loaded from the database, the identity map returns the same instance of the already instantiated object, but if it has not been loaded yet, it loads it and stores the new object in the map. In this way, it follows a similar principle to lazy loading.

There are 4 types of identity maps

1. Explicit
2. Generic
3. Session
4. Class

== See also ==
- Active record
- Identity function
- Map (mathematics)
- Lazy loading
