= Tmpfs =

Temporary file system on Unix-like systems

tmpfs (short for temporary file system) is a temporary file storage paradigm implemented in many Unix-like operating systems. It is intended to appear as a mounted file system, but data is stored in volatile memory rather than on a persistent storage device.

The idea behind tmpfs is similar to that of a RAM disk, in that both provide a file system stored in volatile memory; however, the implementations differ. While tmpfs is implemented at the logical file system layer, a RAM disk is implemented at the physical file system layer. In other words, a RAM disk is a virtual block device with a normal file system running on top of it, while tmpfs is a virtual file system without any underlying block device.

== Semantics ==
Everything stored in tmpfs is temporary in the sense that no files will be directly created on non-volatile storage such as a hard drive (although swap space is used as backing store according to the page replacement policy of the operating system). On reboot, everything in tmpfs will be lost.

The memory used by tmpfs grows and shrinks to accommodate the files it contains.

Many Unix distributions enable and use tmpfs by default for the /tmp branch of the file system or for shared memory. This can be observed with df as in this example:

Filesystem     1K-blocks   Used Available Use% Mounted on 
tmpfs            1686428      0   1686428   0% /dev/shm 
tmpfs             674572   1808    672764   1% /run 
tmpfs               1024      0      1024   0% /run/credentials/systemd-journald.service 
tmpfs            1686428   1628   1684800   1% /tmp 
tmpfs               1024      0      1024   0% /run/credentials/getty@tty1.service 
tmpfs               1024      0      1024   0% /run/credentials/getty@tty3.service 
tmpfs             337284     32    337252   1% /run/user/0 
tmpfs               1024      0      1024   0% /run/credentials/getty@tty4.service 
tmpfs             337284 280464     56820  84% /run/user/1000

Some Linux distributions (e.g. Debian until Debian 13) do not have a tmpfs mounted on /tmp by default; in this case, files under /tmp will be stored in the same file system as /.

On almost all Linux distributions, a tmpfs is mounted on /run/ or /var/run/ to store temporary run-time files such as PID files and Unix domain sockets.

== Implementations ==
There are several independent variants of the tmpfs concept. One of the earliest was developed by Sun Microsystems for SunOS, and other operating systems, such as the BSDs and Linux, provided their own.

=== SunOS ===
SunOS 4 includes what is most likely the earliest implementation of tmpfs; it first appeared in SunOS 4.0 in late 1987, together with new orthogonal address-space management that allowed any object to be memory-mapped.

The Solaris /tmp directory was made a tmpfs file system by default starting with Solaris 2.1, released in December 1992. Output for the Solaris df command will show swap as the background storage for any tmpfs volume:

# df -k
Filesystem  kbytes  used   avail capacity  Mounted on
swap        601592     0  601592     0%    /tmp/test

=== Linux ===
tmpfs is supported by the Linux kernel beginning in version 2.4 (January 4, 2001). Linux tmpfs (previously known as shm fs) is based on the ramfs code used during bootup and also uses the page cache, but, unlike ramfs, it supports swapping out less-used pages to swap space, as well as filesystem size and inode limits to prevent out-of-memory situations (defaulting to half of physical RAM and half the number of RAM pages, respectively).

=== BSD ===
4.2BSD introduced MFS, a memory-based file system implemented by applying the existing FFS disk filesystem to a virtual memory region.

tmpfs, a memory filesystem implemented using conventional in-memory data structures to improve on the performance of MFS, was merged into the official NetBSD source tree on September 10, 2005; it is available in 4.0 and later versions.

FreeBSD has ported NetBSD's implementation, where it is available in 7.0 and later versions.

DragonFly BSD has also ported NetBSD's implementation, where it is available in 2.5.1 and later versions.

OpenBSD ported NetBSD's tmpfs implementation as well, initially started by Pedro Martelletto and improved by many others. It was enabled in builds from December 17, 2013. The first release of OpenBSD with tmpfs included was 5.5. OpenBSD 6.0 disabled tmpfs due to lack of maintenance.

== Advantages ==
Due to the higher speeds of RAM compared to disk storage, tmpfs allows cache to be much faster when stored in one, leading to a more efficient overall system, though operating systems with a page cache will see less benefit as recently-used file pages will remain in-memory if free memory is sufficient. Since RAM is cleared upon reboot, tmpfs prevents systems from becoming too cluttered without requiring users to delete temporary files manually. In addition, storing files in RAM prevents disks from filling up too quickly and extends the life of flash-based storage by reducing write operations.

== Disadvantages ==
On systems without swap space, or where swap space is running low, tmpfs may consume large amounts of memory. In a Linux container with a memory limit, files stored in tmpfs count towards that limit, so a process writing to tmpfs can be stopped by the out-of-memory killer while the file system still reports free space. The memory stays in use until the files are deleted, even after the process that wrote them has exited.

If cache files are stored in tmpfs, programs will lose their cached data across reboots.
