= László Bélády =

Hungarian computer scientist (1928–2021)

László "Les" Bélády
- Born: April 29, 1928; Budapest, Hungary
- Died: November 6, 2021 (aged 93)
- Education: Technical University of Budapest

László "Les" Bélády (April 29, 1928, in Budapest – November 6, 2021) was a Hungarian computer scientist notable for devising the Bélády's Min theoretical memory caching algorithm in 1966 while working at IBM Research. He also demonstrated the existence of a Bélády's anomaly. During the 1980s, he was the editor-in-chief of the IEEE Transactions on Software Engineering.

== Education ==
Bélády earned B.S. in Mechanical Engineering, then an M.S. in Aeronautical Engineering at the Technical University of Budapest in 1950.

== Life and career ==
He left Hungary after the Hungarian Revolution of 1956. Then he worked as a draftsman at Ford Motor Company in Cologne and as an aerodynamics engineer at Dassault in Paris. In 1961, he immigrated to the United States. In the 1960s and 1970s, he primarily lived in New York City with stints in California and England, where he joined International Business Machines and did early work in operating systems, virtual machine architectures, program behavior modeling, memory management, computer graphics, Asian character sets, and data security.

From 1961–1981, he worked at IBM Corp. at the Thomas J. Watson Research Center, where he worked as program manager for software technology. In his later years at IBM, he was responsible for software engineering worldwide until leaving for Tokyo to create its software research lab. In 1981, he worked as manager of software engineering at Japan Science Institute for two years. In 1984, he joined the Microelectronics and Computer Technology Corporation in Austin and founded its Software Technology Program. He focused the program on creating advanced technology for aiding the distributed design of large complex software systems. From 1991 to 1998, he served as president and CEO of Mitsubishi Electric Research Laboratories, Inc. (MERL). He has been in various University advisory roles including a member of the computer science advisory board at the University of Colorado at Boulder and foreign member of the Hungarian Academy of Sciences. In his retirement he spent much of his time in Budapest and Austin.

== Attainment ==
Bélády is known for the "Belady Algorithm", the OPT (or MIN) Page Replacement Algorithm. He co-designed and built IBM M44/44X, an experimental machine which is the first computer with multiple virtual machine organization. He is co-founder of an industrial research consortium, the MCC. Bélády also participated in the design of the earliest commercial time-sharing systems, the TSS-67.

== Awards ==
- 1969 & 1973: IBM Outstanding Contribution Awards
- 1988: IEEE "for contributions to the design of large software systems"
- 1990: J. D. Warnier Prize for Excellence in Information

== Publications ==
- Belady, Laszlo A., "A Study of Replacement Algorithms for a Virtual Storage Computer," IBM Systems Journal, Vol. 5, No. 2 June 1966, pp. 78–10.
- Belady, Laszlo A., and Meir L. Lehman, Program Evolution, Processes of Software Change, Academic Press, London, 1985.
