= Learning augmented algorithm =

A learning augmented algorithm (also called algorithm with predictions) is an algorithm that can make use of a prediction to improve its performance. Whereas in regular algorithms just the problem instance is inputted, learning augmented algorithms accept an extra parameter. This extra parameter often is a prediction of some property of the solution. This prediction is then used by the algorithm to improve its running time or the quality of its output. The most common application are online algorithms, where a prediction on the uncertain instance is provided.

== Description ==
A learning augmented algorithm typically takes an input $(\mathcal{I}, \mathcal{A})$. Here $\mathcal{I}$ is a problem instance and $\mathcal{A}$ is the prediction. A prediction can be any object. Common are the following types:

- Prediction of an optimal solution. The prediction gives a solution to the problem or characterizes an optimal solution.
- Prediction of the input. This is mainly used for online problems.
- Prediction of algorithmic actions. A prediction tailored to a specific algorithm that suggests a specific algorithm execution.

Learning augmented algorithms usually satisfy the following three properties:

- Consistency. A learning augmented algorithm is said to be consistent if the algorithm can be proven to have a good performance when it is provided with an accurate prediction.
- Smoothness. A learning augmented algorithm is called smooth if its performance can be bounded by a function of the quality of the prediction. Here, the quality can be measured in a problem specific way. This is also called the prediction error.
- Robustness. A learning augmented algorithm is called robust if its worst-case performance can be bounded even if the given prediction is inaccurate.

Learning augmented algorithms generally do not prescribe how the prediction should be done. For this purpose machine learning can be used.

== Applications ==
A few examples of problems where learning augmented algorithms have been applied are the following.

=== Online algorithms ===
- The ski rental problem
- The weighted paging problem
- The set cover problem
- Nonclairvoyant scheduling
- The online bipartite matching problem

=== Warm starting ===
==== Data structures ====
The binary search algorithm is an algorithm for finding elements of a sorted list $x_1,\ldots,x_n$. It needs $O(\log(n))$ steps to find an element with some known value $y$ in a list of length $n$. With a prediction $i$ for the position of $y$, the following learning augmented algorithm can be used.

- First, look at position $i$ in the list. If $x_i=y$, the element has been found.
- If $x_i<y$, look at positions $i+1,i+2,i+4,\ldots$ until an index $j$ with $x_j\geq y$ is found.
  - Now perform a binary search on $x_i,\ldots, x_j$.
- If $x_i>y$, do the same as in the previous case, but instead consider $i-1,i-2,i-4,\ldots$.

The error is defined to be $\eta=|i-i^*|$, where $i^*$ is the real index of $y$. In the learning augmented algorithm, probing the positions $i+1,i+2,i+4,\ldots$ takes $\log_2(\eta)$ steps. Then a binary search is performed on a list of size at most $2\eta$, which takes $\log_2(\eta)$ steps. This makes the total running time of the algorithm $2\log_2(\eta)$. So, when the error is small, the algorithm is faster than a normal binary search. This shows that the algorithm is consistent. Even in the worst case, the error will be at most $n$. Then the algorithm takes at most $O(\log(n))$ steps, so the algorithm is robust.

==== More examples ====
- The maximum weight matching problem

=== Approximation algorithms ===
- The maximum cut problem
- The vertex cover problem

=== Mechanism Design ===
- The facility location problem

== See also ==
- Machine learning
