= Disk cache =

Disk cache may refer to:

- Disk buffer, the small amount of RAM embedded on a hard disk drive, used to store the data going to and coming from the disk platters
- Page cache, the cache of data residing on a storage device, kept by the operating systems and stored in unused main memory
- General application-level caching of the data residing on a storage device
