= Virtual address space =

Set of ranges of virtual addresses

Diagram of the relationship between the virtual and physical address spaces

In computing, a virtual address space (VAS) is an area of contiguous virtual memory locations, called virtual addresses, which an operating system makes available to a process for executing instructions and storing data, and which it maps to the address space of physical addresses in a computer's hardware memory. The range of virtual addresses usually starts at a low address and can extend to the highest address allowed by the computer's instruction set architecture and supported by the operating system's pointer size implementation, which can be 4 bytes for 32-bit or 8 bytes for 64-bit OS versions. This provides several benefits including security through process isolation, assuming each process is given a separate address space.

== Example ==
In the following description, the terminology used will be particular to the Windows NT operating system, but the concepts are applicable to other virtual memory operating systems.

When a new application on a 32-bit OS is executed, the process has a 4 GiB VAS: each one of the memory addresses (from 0 to 2^{32} − 1) in that space can have a single byte as a value. Initially, none of them have values (- represents no value). Using or setting values in such a VAS would cause a memory exception.

            0                                           4 GiB
 VAS        |----------------------------------------------|

Then the application's executable file is mapped into the VAS. Addresses in the process VAS are mapped to bytes in the EXE file. The OS manages the mapping:

            0                                           4 GiB
 VAS        |---vvv----------------------------------------|
 mapping        |||
 file bytes     app

The symbol v represents values from bytes in the mapped file. Required DLL files are then mapped (this includes custom libraries in addition to system libraries such as kernel32.dll and user32.dll):

            0                                           4 GiB
 VAS        |---vvv--------vvvvvv---vvvv-------------------|
 mapping        |||        ||||||   ||||
 file bytes     app        kernel   user

The process then starts executing bytes in the EXE file. However, the only way the process can use or set - values in its VAS is to ask the OS to map them to bytes from a file. A common way to use VAS memory in this way is to map it to the page file. The page file is a single file, but multiple distinct sets of contiguous bytes can be mapped into a VAS:

            0                                           4 GiB
 VAS        |---vvv--------vvvvvv---vvvv---vv-----v----vvv-|
 mapping        |||        ||||||   ||||   ||     |    |||
 file bytes     app        kernel   user   system_page_file

And different parts of the page file can map into the VAS of different processes:

            0                                           4 GiB
 VAS        |---vvvv-------vvvvvv---vvvv---vv-----v----vvv-|
 mapping        ||||       ||||||   ||||   ||     |    |||
 file bytes     app1 app2  kernel   user   system_page_file
 mapping             ||||  ||||||   ||||       ||    |
 VAS 2      |--------vvvv--vvvvvv---vvvv-------vv----v-----|

On Microsoft Windows 32-bit, by default, only 2 GiB are made available to processes for their own use. The other 2 GiB are used by the operating system. On later 32-bit editions of Microsoft Windows, it is possible to extend the user-mode virtual address space to 3 GiB while only 1 GiB is left for kernel-mode virtual address space by marking the programs as IMAGE_FILE_LARGE_ADDRESS_AWARE and enabling the /3GB switch in the boot.ini file.

On Microsoft Windows 64-bit, in a process running an executable that was linked with /LARGEADDRESSAWARE:NO, the operating system artificially limits the user mode portion of the process's virtual address space to 2 GiB. This applies to both 32- and 64-bit executables. Processes running executables that were linked with the /LARGEADDRESSAWARE:YES option, which is the default for 64-bit Visual Studio 2010 and later, have access to more than 2 GiB of virtual address space: up to 4 GiB for 32-bit executables, up to 8 TiB for 64-bit executables in Windows through Windows 8, and up to 128 TiB for 64-bit executables in Windows 8.1 and later.

Allocating memory via C's malloc establishes the page file as the backing store for any new virtual address space. However, a process can also explicitly map file bytes.

== Linux ==
For x86 32-bit CPUs, Linux allows splitting the user and kernel address ranges in different ways: 3G/1G user/kernel (default), 1G/3G user/kernel or 2G/2G user/kernel.

== See also ==
- Linear address space
- Single address space operating system
