= Page address register =

A page address register (PAR) contains the physical addresses of pages currently held in the main memory of a computer system. PARs are used in order to avoid excessive use of an address table in some operating systems. A PAR may check a page's number against all entries in the PAR simultaneously, allowing it to retrieve the pages physical address quickly. A PAR is used by a single process and is only used for pages which are frequently referenced (though these pages may change as the process's behaviour changes in accordance with the principle of locality). An example computer which made use of PARs is the Atlas.

== See also ==
- Translation Lookaside Buffer (TLB)
