= Translation lookaside buffer =

Processor design concept

In computing and processor design, a translation lookaside buffer (TLB) is a memory cache that stores the recent translations of virtual memory addresses to physical memory addresses. It is used to reduce the time taken to access a user memory location. It can be called an address-translation cache. It is a part of the chip's memory-management unit (MMU). A TLB may reside between the CPU and the CPU cache, between CPU cache and the main memory or between the different levels of the multi-level cache. The majority of desktop, laptop, and server processors include one or more TLBs in the memory-management hardware, and it is nearly always present in any processor that uses paged or segmented virtual memory.

The TLB is sometimes implemented as content-addressable memory (CAM). The CAM search key is the virtual address, and the search result is a physical address. If the requested address is present in the TLB, the CAM search yields a match quickly and the retrieved physical address can be used to access memory. This is called a TLB hit. If the requested address is not in the TLB, it is a miss, and the translation proceeds by looking up the page table in a process called a page walk. The page walk is time-consuming when compared to the processor speed, as it involves reading the contents of multiple memory locations and using them to compute the physical address. After the physical address is determined by the page walk, the virtual address to physical address mapping is entered into the TLB. The PowerPC 604, for example, has a two-way set-associative TLB for data loads and stores. Some processors have different instruction and data address TLBs.

== Overview ==
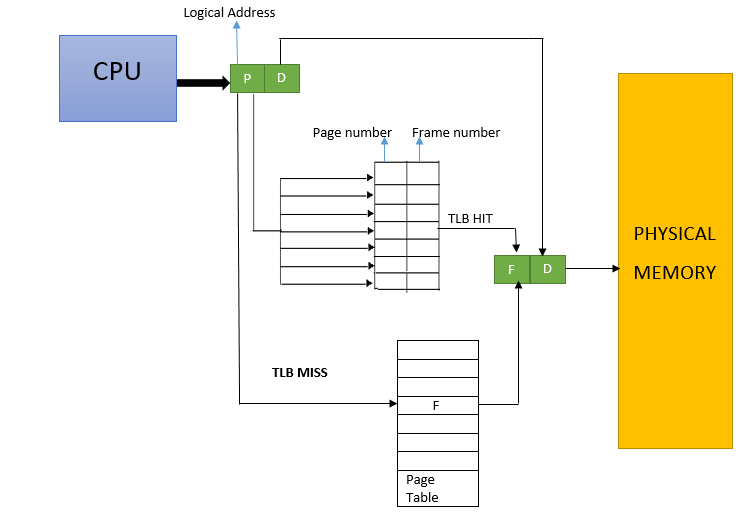
General working of TLB

A TLB has a fixed number of slots containing page-table entries and segment-table entries; page-table entries map virtual addresses to physical addresses and intermediate-table addresses, while segment-table entries map virtual addresses to segment addresses, intermediate-table addresses and page-table addresses. The virtual memory is the memory space as seen from a process; this space is often split into pages of a fixed size (in paged memory), or less commonly into segments of variable sizes (in segmented memory). The page table, generally stored in main memory, keeps track of where the virtual pages are stored in the physical memory. This method uses two memory accesses (one for the page-table entry, one for the byte) to access a byte. First, the page table is looked up for the frame number. Second, the frame number with the page offset gives the actual address. Thus, any straightforward virtual memory scheme would have the effect of doubling the memory access time. Hence, the TLB is used to reduce the time taken to access the memory locations in the page-table method. The TLB is a cache of the page table, representing only a subset of the page-table contents.

Referencing the physical memory addresses, a TLB may reside between the CPU and the CPU cache, between the CPU cache and primary storage memory, or between levels of a multi-level cache. The placement determines whether the cache uses physical or virtual addressing. If the cache is virtually addressed, requests are sent directly from the CPU to the cache, and the TLB is accessed only on a cache miss. If the cache is physically addressed, the CPU does a TLB lookup on every memory operation, and the resulting physical address is sent to the cache.

In a Harvard architecture or modified Harvard architecture, a separate virtual address space or memory-access hardware may exist for instructions and data. This can lead to distinct TLBs for each access type, an instruction translation lookaside buffer (ITLB) and a data translation lookaside buffer (DTLB). Various benefits have been demonstrated with separate data and instruction TLBs.

The TLB can be used as a fast lookup hardware cache. The figure shows the working of a TLB. Each entry in the TLB consists of two parts: a tag and a value. If the tag of the incoming virtual address matches the tag in the TLB, the corresponding value is returned. Since the TLB lookup is usually a part of the instruction pipeline, searches are fast and cause essentially no performance penalty. However, to be able to search within the instruction pipeline, the TLB has to be small.

A common optimization for physically addressed caches is to perform the TLB lookup in parallel with the cache access. Upon each virtual memory reference, the hardware checks the TLB to see whether the page number is held therein. If yes, it is a TLB hit, and the translation is made. The frame number is returned and is used to access the memory. If the page number is not in the TLB, the page table must be checked. Depending on the CPU, this can be done automatically in hardware or using an interrupt to the operating system. When the frame number is obtained, it can be used to access the memory. In addition, we add the page number and frame number to the TLB, so that they will be found quickly on the next reference. If the TLB is already full, a suitable block must be selected for replacement. There are different replacement methods like least recently used (LRU), first in, first out (FIFO) etc.; see the address translation section in the cache article for more details about virtual addressing as it pertains to caches and TLBs.

== Performance implications ==
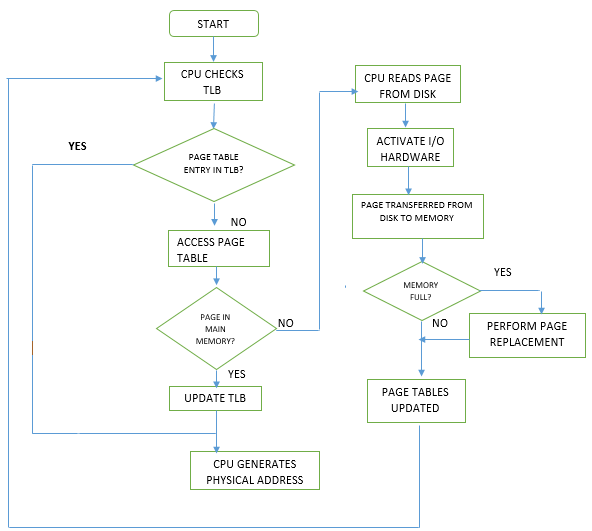
Flowchart shows the working of a translation lookaside buffer. For simplicity, the page-fault routine is not mentioned.

The CPU has to access main memory for an instruction-cache miss, data-cache miss, or TLB miss. The third case (the simplest one) is where the desired information itself actually is in a cache, but the information for virtual-to-physical translation is not in a TLB. These are all slow, due to the need to access a slower level of the memory hierarchy, so a well-functioning TLB is important. Indeed, a TLB miss can be more expensive than an instruction or data cache miss, due to the need for not just a load from main memory, but a page walk, requiring several memory accesses.

The flowchart provided explains the working of a TLB. If it is a TLB miss, then the CPU checks the page table for the page table entry. If the present bit is set, then the page is in main memory, and the processor can retrieve the frame number from the page-table entry to form the physical address. The processor also updates the TLB to include the new page-table entry. Finally, if the present bit is not set, then the desired page is not in the main memory, and a page fault is issued. Then a page-fault interrupt is called, which executes the page-fault handling routine.

If the page working set does not fit into the TLB, then TLB thrashing occurs, where frequent TLB misses occur, with each newly cached page displacing one that will soon be used again, degrading performance in exactly the same way as thrashing of the instruction or data cache does. TLB thrashing can occur even if instruction-cache or data-cache thrashing are not occurring, because these are cached in different-size units. Instructions and data are cached in small blocks (cache lines), not entire pages, but address lookup is done at the page level. Thus, even if the code and data working sets fit into cache, if the working sets are fragmented across many pages, the virtual-address working set may not fit into TLB, causing TLB thrashing. Appropriate sizing of the TLB thus requires considering not only the size of the corresponding instruction and data caches, but also how these are fragmented across multiple pages.

== Multiple TLBs ==
Similar to caches, TLBs may have multiple levels. CPUs can be (and nowadays usually are) built with multiple TLBs, for example a small L1 TLB (potentially fully associative) that is extremely fast, and a larger L2 TLB that is somewhat slower. When instruction-TLB (ITLB) and data-TLB (DTLB) are used, a CPU can have three (ITLB1, DTLB1, TLB2) or four TLBs.

For instance, Intel's Nehalem microarchitecture has a four-way set associative L1 DTLB with 64 entries for 4 KiB pages and 32 entries for 2/4 MiB pages, an L1 ITLB with 128 entries for 4 KiB pages using four-way associativity and 14 fully associative entries for 2/4 MiB pages (both parts of the ITLB divided statically between two threads) and a unified 512-entry L2 TLB for 4 KiB pages, both 4-way associative.

Some TLBs may have separate sections for small pages and huge pages. For example, Intel Skylake microarchitecture separates the TLB entries for 1 GiB pages from those for 4 KiB/2 MiB pages.

== TLB-miss handling ==
Three schemes for handling TLB misses are found in modern architectures:

- With hardware TLB management, the CPU automatically walks the page tables (using the CR3 register on x86, for instance) to see whether there is a valid page-table entry for the specified virtual address. If an entry exists, it is brought into the TLB, and the TLB access is retried: this time the access will hit, and the program can proceed normally. If the CPU finds no valid entry for the virtual address in the page tables, it raises a page fault exception, which the operating system must handle. Handling page faults usually involves bringing the requested data into physical memory, setting up a page table entry to map the faulting virtual address to the correct physical address, and resuming the program. With a hardware-managed TLB, the format of the TLB entries is not visible to software and can change from CPU to CPU without causing loss of compatibility for the operating system.
- With software-managed TLBs, a TLB miss generates a TLB miss exception, and operating system code is responsible for walking the page tables and finding the appropriate page table entry. The operating system then loads the information from that page table entry into the TLB and restarts the program from the instruction that caused the TLB miss. As with hardware TLB management, if the OS finds no valid translation in the page tables, a page fault has occurred, and the OS must handle it accordingly. Instruction sets of CPUs that have software-managed TLBs have instructions that allow loading entries into any slot in the TLB. The format of the TLB entry is defined as a part of the instruction set architecture (ISA).
- With firmware-managed TLBs, a TLB miss causes a trap to system firmware, which is responsible for walking the page tables and finding the appropriate page table entry, similarly to what a TLB miss handler does for a software-managed TLB. With a firmware-managed TLB, the format of the TLB entries is not visible to system software and can change from CPU to CPU without causing loss of compatibility for the operating system.

The MIPS architecture specifies a software-managed TLB.

The SPARC V9 architecture allows an implementation of SPARC V9 to have no MMU, an MMU with a software-managed TLB, or an MMU with a hardware-managed TLB, and the UltraSPARC Architecture 2005 specifies a software-managed TLB.

The Itanium architecture provides an option of using either software- or hardware-managed TLBs.

The Alpha architecture has a firmware-managed TLB, with the TLB miss handling code being in PALcode, rather than in the operating system. As the PALcode for a processor can be processor-specific and operating-system-specific, this allows different versions of PALcode to implement different page-table formats for different operating systems, without requiring that the TLB format, and the instructions to control the TLB, to be specified by the architecture.

== Typical TLB ==
These are typical performance levels of a TLB:

- Size: 12 bits – 4,096 entries
- Hit time: 0.5 – 1 clock cycle
- Miss penalty: 10 – 100 clock cycles
- Miss rate: 0.01 – 1% (20–40% for sparse/graph applications)

The average effective memory cycle rate is defined as $m + (1-p)h + pm$ cycles, where $m$ is the number of cycles required for a memory read, $p$ is the miss rate, and $h$ is the hit time in cycles. If a TLB hit takes 1 clock cycle, a miss takes 30 clock cycles, a memory read takes 30 clock cycles, and the miss rate is 1%, the effective memory cycle rate is an average of $30 + 0.99 \times 1 + 0.01 \times 30$ (31.29 clock cycles per memory access).

== Address-space switch ==
On an address-space switch, as occurs when context switching between processes (but not between threads), some TLB entries can become invalid, since the virtual-to-physical mapping is different. The simplest strategy to deal with this is to completely flush the TLB. This means that after a switch, the TLB is empty, and any memory reference will be a miss, so it will be some time before things are running back at full speed. Newer CPUs use more effective strategies marking which process an entry is for. This means that if a second process runs for only a short time and jumps back to a first process, the TLB may still have valid entries, saving the time to reload them.

Other strategies avoid flushing the TLB on a context switch: (a) A single address space operating system uses the same virtual-to-physical mapping for all processes. (b) Some CPUs have a process ID register, and the hardware uses TLB entries only if they match the current process ID.

For example, in the Alpha 21264, each TLB entry is tagged with an address space number (ASN), and only TLB entries with an ASN matching the current task are considered valid. For another example, in the Intel Pentium Pro, the page global enable (PGE) flag in the register CR4 and the global (G) flag of a page-directory or page-table entry can be used to prevent frequently used pages from being automatically invalidated in the TLBs on a task switch or a load of register CR3. Since the 2010 Westmere microarchitecture Intel 64 processors also support 12-bit process-context identifiers (PCIDs), which allow retaining TLB entries for multiple linear-address spaces, with only those that match the current PCID being used for address translation.

While selective flushing of the TLB is an option in software-managed TLBs, the only option in some hardware TLBs (for example, the TLB in the Intel 80386) is the complete flushing of the TLB on an address-space switch. Other hardware TLBs (for example, the TLB in the Intel 80486 and later x86 processors, and the TLB in ARM processors) allow the flushing of individual entries from the TLB indexed by virtual address.

Flushing of the TLB can be an important security mechanism for memory isolation between processes to ensure a process can't access data stored in memory pages of another process. Memory isolation is especially critical during switches between the privileged operating system kernel process and the user processes – as was highlighted by the Meltdown security vulnerability. Mitigation strategies such as kernel page-table isolation (KPTI) rely heavily on performance-impacting TLB flushes and benefit greatly from hardware-enabled selective TLB entry management such as PCID.

== Virtualization and x86 TLB ==
With the advent of virtualization for server consolidation, a lot of effort has gone into making the x86 architecture easier to virtualize and to ensure better performance of virtual machines on x86 hardware.

Normally, entries in the x86 TLBs are not associated with a particular address space; they implicitly refer to the current address space. Hence, every time there is a change in address space, such as a context switch, the entire TLB has to be flushed. Maintaining a tag that associates each TLB entry with an address space in software and comparing this tag during TLB lookup and TLB flush is very expensive, especially since the x86 TLB is designed to operate with very low latency and completely in hardware. In 2008, both Intel (Nehalem) and AMD (SVM) have introduced tags as part of the TLB entry and dedicated hardware that checks the tag during lookup. Not all operating systems made full use of these tags immediately, but Linux 4.14 started using them to identify recently used address spaces, since the 12-bits PCIDs (4095 different values) are insufficient for all tasks running on a given CPU.

== See also ==
- Memory management
- Paging
- Page Size Extension (PSE)
- Virtual address space
