= Memory model =

Memory model may refer to:

== Psychology ==
- Atkinson–Shiffrin memory model
- Baddeley's model of working memory
- Memory-prediction model

== Computer science ==
- Memory model (programming) describes how threads interact through memory
  - Java memory model
  - Consistency model
- Memory model (addressing scheme), an addressing scheme for computer memory address space
  - Flat memory model
  - Paged memory model
  - Segmented memory
  - One of the x86 memory models
