= X86 =

Family of instruction set architectures

x86
- Designer: Intel, AMD
- Bits: 16-bit, 32-bit and 64-bit
- Introduced: 1978 (16-bit), 1985 (32-bit), 2003 (64-bit)
- Design: CISC
- Type: Register–memory
- Encoding: Variable (1 to 15 bytes)
- Branching: Condition code
- Endianness: Little
- Page size: 8086–i286: None i386, i486: 4 KB pages P5 Pentium: added 4 MB pages (Legacy PAE: 4 KB→2 MB) x86-64: added 1 GB pages
- Extensions: x87, IA-32, x86-64, MMX, 3DNow!, SSE, MCA, ACPI, SSE2, NX bit, SMT, SSE3, SSSE3, SSE4.1, SSE4.2, AES-NI, CLMUL, SM3, SM4, RDRAND, SHA, MPX, SME, TME, SGX, XOP, F16C, ADX, BMI, FMA, AVX, AVX2, AVX-VNNI, AVX-IFMA, AVX512, AVX10, AMX, VT-x, VT-d, AMD-V, AMD-Vi, TSX, ASF, TXT, APX
- Open: Mixed

Registers
- General-purpose: 16-bit: 8 GPRs, including BP and SP; 32-bit: 8 GPRs, including EBP and ESP; 64-bit: 16 GPRs, including RBP and RSP; 32 GPRs, If CPU supports APX
- Floating-point: 16-bit: optional separate x87 FPU; 32-bit: optional separate or integrated x87 FPU, integrated SSE units in later processors; 64-bit: integrated x87 and SSE2 units, later implementations extended to AVX2 and AVX512

x86 (also known as 80x86 or the 8086 family) is a family of complex instruction set computer (CISC) instruction set architectures (Note: Unlike the microarchitecture (and specific electronic and physical implementation) used for a specific microprocessor design.) initially developed by Intel, based on the 8086 microprocessor and its 8-bit-external-bus variant, the 8088. The 8086 was introduced in 1978 as a fully 16-bit extension of Intel's 8-bit 8080 microprocessor, with memory segmentation as a solution for addressing more memory than can be covered by a plain 16-bit address. The term "x86" came into being because the names of several successors to Intel's 8086 processor end in "86", including the 80186, 80286, 80386 and 80486. Colloquially, their names were "186", "286", "386" and "486".

The term is not synonymous with IBM PC compatibility, as this implies a multitude of other computer hardware. Embedded systems and general-purpose computers used x86 chips before the PC-compatible market started, (Note: The GRID Compass laptop, for instance.) some of them before the IBM PC (1981) debut.

As of June 2022, most desktop and laptop computers sold are based on the x86 architecture family, while mobile categories such as smartphones or tablets are dominated by ARM. At the high end, x86 continues to dominate computation-intensive workstation and cloud computing segments.

== Overview ==
In the 1980s and early 1990s, when the 8088 and 80286 were still in common use, the term x86 usually represented any 8086-compatible CPU. Today, however, x86 usually implies binary compatibility with the 32-bit instruction set of the 80386. This is due to the fact that this instruction set has become something of a lowest common denominator for many modern operating systems and also probably because the term became common after the introduction of the 80386 in 1985.

A few years after the introduction of the 8086 and 8088, Intel added some complexity to its naming scheme and terminology as the "iAPX" of the ambitious but ill-fated Intel iAPX 432 processor was tried on the more successful 8086 family of chips, (Note: Including the 8088, 80186, 80188 and 80286 processors.) applied as a kind of system-level prefix. An 8086 system, including coprocessors such as 8087 and 8089, and simpler Intel-specific system chips, (Note: Such a system also contained the usual mix of standard 7400 series support components, including multiplexers, buffers, and glue logic.) was thereby described as an iAPX 86 system. (Note: The actual meaning of iAPX was Intel Advanced Performance Architecture, or sometimes Intel Advanced Processor Architecture.) There were also terms iRMX (for operating systems), iSBC (for single-board computers), and iSBX (for multimodule boards based on the 8086 architecture), all together under the heading Microsystem 80. However, this naming scheme was quite temporary, lasting for a few years during the early 1980s. (Note: late 1981 to early 1984, approximately)

Although the 8086 was primarily developed for embedded systems and small multi-user or single-user computers, largely as a response to the successful 8080-compatible Zilog Z80, the x86 line soon grew in features and processing power. Today, x86 is ubiquitous in both stationary and portable personal computers, and is also used in video game consoles, midrange computers, workstations, servers, and most new supercomputer clusters of the TOP500 list. A large amount of software, including a large list of x86 operating systems are using x86-based hardware.

Modern x86 is relatively uncommon in embedded systems, however; small low power applications (using tiny batteries), and low-cost microprocessor markets, such as home appliances and toys, lack significant x86 presence. (Note: The embedded processor market is populated by more than 25 different architectures, which, due to the price sensitivity, low power, and hardware simplicity requirements, outnumber the x86.) Simple 8- and 16-bit based architectures are common here, as well as simpler RISC architectures like ARM and RISC-V, although the x86-compatible VIA C7, VIA Nano, AMD's Geode, Athlon Neo and Intel Atom are examples of 32- and 64-bit designs used in some relatively low-power and low-cost segments.

There have been several attempts, including by Intel, to end the market dominance of the "inelegant" x86 architecture designed directly from the first simple 8-bit microprocessors. Examples of this are the iAPX 432 (a project originally named the Intel 8800), the Intel 960, Intel 860 and the Intel/Hewlett-Packard Itanium architecture. However, the continuous refinement of x86 microarchitectures, circuitry and semiconductor manufacturing would make it hard to replace x86 in many segments. AMD's 64-bit extension of x86 (which Intel eventually responded to with a compatible design) and the scalability of x86 chips in the form of modern multi-core CPUs, make x86 an example of how continuous refinement of established industry standards can resist the competition from completely new architectures.

For some advanced features, x86 may require a license from Intel, though some do not need it; x86-64 may require an additional license from AMD.

== Chronology ==
The table below lists processor models and model series implementing various architectures in the x86 family, in chronological order. Each line item is characterized by significantly improved or commercially successful processor microarchitecture designs.

Chronology of x86 processors
| Era | | Introduction | Prominent CPU models | Address space | | | Notable features |
| Era | | Introduction | Prominent CPU models | Linear | Virtual | Physical | Notable features |
|---|---|---|---|---|---|---|---|
| x86-16 | 1st | 1978 | Intel 8086, Intel 8088 (1979) | 16-bit | NA | 20-bit | 16-bit ISA, IBM PC (8088), IBM PC/XT (8088) |
| x86-16 | 1st | 1982 | Intel 80186, Intel 80188; NEC V20/V30 (1983) | 16-bit | NA | 20-bit | 8086-2 ISA, embedded (80186/80188) |
| x86-16 | 2nd | 1982 | Intel 80286 and clones | 16-bit | 30-bit | 24-bit | protected mode, IBM PC/XT 286, IBM PC/AT |
| IA-32 | 3rd | 1985 | Intel 80386, AMD Am386 (1991) | 32-bit | 46-bit | 32-bit | 32-bit ISA, paging, IBM PS/2 |
| IA-32 | 4th (pipelining, cache) | 1989 | Intel 80486; Cyrix Cx486S, DLC (1992); AMD Am486 (1993), Am5x86 (1995) | 32-bit | 46-bit | 32-bit | pipelining, on-die x87 FPU (486DX), on-die cache |
| IA-32 | 5th (Superscalar) | 1993 | Intel Pentium, Pentium MMX (1996) | 32-bit | 46-bit | 32-bit | Superscalar, 64-bit databus, faster FPU, MMX (Pentium MMX), APIC, SMP |
| IA-32 | 5th (Superscalar) | 1994 | NexGen Nx586; AMD 5k86/K5 (1996) | 32-bit | 46-bit | 32-bit | Discrete microarchitecture (μ-op translation) |
| IA-32 | 5th (Superscalar) | 1995 | Cyrix Cx5x86; Cyrix 6x86/MX (1997)/MII (1998) | 32-bit | 46-bit | 32-bit | dynamic execution |
| IA-32 | 6th (PAE, μ-op translation) | 1995 | Intel Pentium Pro | 32-bit | 46-bit | 36-bit (PAE) | μ-op translation, conditional move instructions, dynamic execution, speculative execution, 3-way x86 superscalar, superscalar FPU, PAE, on-chip L2 cache |
| IA-32 | 6th (PAE, μ-op translation) | 1997 | Intel Pentium II, Pentium III (1999); Celeron (1998), Xeon (1998) | 32-bit | 46-bit | 36-bit (PAE) | on-package (Pentium II) or on-die (Celeron) L2 Cache, SSE (Pentium III), Slot 1, Socket 370 or Slot 2 (Xeon) |
| IA-32 | 6th (PAE, μ-op translation) | 1997 | AMD K6/K6-2 (1998)/K6-III (1999) | 32-bit | 46-bit | 32-bit | 3DNow!, 3-level cache system (K6-III) |
| IA-32 | Enhanced Platform | 1999 | AMD Athlon; Athlon XP/MP (2001); Duron (2000); Sempron (2004) | 32-bit | 46-bit | 36-bit | MMX+, 3DNow!+, double-pumped bus, Slot A or Socket A |
| IA-32 | Enhanced Platform | 2000 | Transmeta Crusoe | 32-bit | 46-bit | 32-bit | CMS powered x86 platform processor, VLIW-128 core, on-die memory controller, on-die PCI bridge logic |
| IA-32 | Enhanced Platform | 2000 | Intel Pentium 4 | 32-bit | 46-bit | 36-bit | SSE2, HTT (Northwood), NetBurst, quad-pumped bus, Trace Cache, Socket 478 |
| IA-32 | Enhanced Platform | 2003 | Intel Pentium M Intel Core (2006); Pentium Dual-Core (2007) | 32-bit | 46-bit | 36-bit | μ-op fusion, XD bit (Dothan) (Intel Core "Yonah") |
| IA-32 | Enhanced Platform | 2003 | Transmeta Efficeon | 32-bit | 46-bit | 36-bit | CMS 6.0.4, VLIW-256, NX bit, HT |
| IA-64 | 64-bit Transition; 1999–2005 | 2001 | Intel Itanium (2001–2017) | 52-bit | | | 64-bit EPIC architecture, 128-bit VLIW instruction bundle, on-die hardware IA-32 H/W enabling x86 OSes & x86 applications (early generations), software IA-32 EL enabling x86 applications (Itanium 2), Itanium register files are remapped to x86 registers |
| x86-64 | 64-bit Extended since 2001 | x86-64 is the 64-bit extended architecture of x86, its Legacy Mode preserves the entire and unaltered x86 architecture. The native architecture of x86-64 processors: residing in the 64-bit Mode, lacks of access mode in segmentation, presenting 64-bit architectural-permit linear address space; an adapted IA-32 architecture residing in the Compatibility Mode alongside 64-bit Mode is provided to support most x86 applications | | | | | |
| x86-64 | 64-bit Extended since 2001 | 2003 | Athlon 64/FX/X2 (2005), Opteron; Sempron (2004)/X2 (2008); Turion 64 (2005)/X2 (2006) | 40-bit | | | AMD64 (except some Sempron processors presented as purely x86 processors), on-die memory controller, HyperTransport, on-die dual-core (X2), AMD-V (Athlon 64 Orleans), Socket 754/939/940 or AM2 |
| x86-64 | 64-bit Extended since 2001 | 2004 | Pentium 4 (Prescott); Celeron D, Pentium D (2005) | 36-bit | | | EM64T (enabled on selected models of Pentium 4 and Celeron D), SSE3, 2nd gen. NetBurst pipelining, dual-core (on-die: Pentium D 8xx, on-chip: Pentium D 9xx), Intel VT (Pentium 4 6x2), socket LGA 775 |
| x86-64 | 64-bit Extended since 2001 | 2006 | Intel Core 2 Pentium Dual-Core (2007); Celeron Dual-Core (2008) | 36-bit | | | Intel 64 (<<== EM64T), SSSE3 (65 nm), wide dynamic execution, μ-op fusion, macro-op fusion in 16-bit and 32-bit mode, on-chip quad-core(Core 2 Quad), Smart Shared L2 Cache (Intel Core 2 "Merom") |
| x86-64 | 64-bit Extended since 2001 | 2007 | AMD Phenom/II (2008); Athlon II (2009); Turion II (2009) | 48-bit | | | Monolithic quad-core (X4)/triple-core (X3), SSE4a, Rapid Virtualization Indexing (RVI), HyperTransport 3, AM2+ or AM3 |
| x86-64 | 64-bit Extended since 2001 | 2008 | Intel Core 2 (45 nm) | 40-bit | | | SSE4.1 |
| x86-64 | 64-bit Extended since 2001 | 2008 | Intel Atom | 40-bit | | | netbook or low power smart device processor, P54C core reused |
| x86-64 | 64-bit Extended since 2001 | 2008 | Intel Core i7 Core i5 (2009); Core i3 (2010) | 40-bit | | | QuickPath, on-chip GMCH (Clarkdale), SSE4.2, Extended Page Tables (EPT) for virtualization, macro-op fusion in 64-bit mode, (Intel Xeon "Bloomfield" with Nehalem microarchitecture) |
| x86-64 | 64-bit Extended since 2001 | 2008 | VIA Nano | 40-bit | | | hardware-based encryption; adaptive power management |
| x86-64 | 64-bit Extended since 2001 | 2010 | AMD FX | 48-bit | | | octa-core, CMT(Clustered Multi-Thread), FMA, OpenCL, AM3+ |
| x86-64 | 64-bit Extended since 2001 | 2011 | AMD APU A and E Series (Llano) | 40-bit | | | on-die GPGPU, PCI Express 2.0, Socket FM1 |
| x86-64 | 64-bit Extended since 2001 | 2011 | AMD APU C, E and Z Series (Bobcat) | 36-bit | | | low power smart device APU |
| x86-64 | 64-bit Extended since 2001 | 2011 | Intel Core i3, Core i5 and Core i7 (Sandy Bridge/Ivy Bridge) | 36-bit | | | Internal Ring connection, decoded μ-op cache, LGA 1155 socket |
| x86-64 | 64-bit Extended since 2001 | 2012 | AMD APU A Series (Bulldozer, Trinity and later) | 48-bit | | | AVX, Bulldozer-based APU, Socket FM2 or Socket FM2+ |
| x86-64 | 64-bit Extended since 2001 | 2012 | Intel Xeon Phi (Knights Corner) | 48-bit | | | PCI-E add-on card coprocessor for XEON based system, Manycore Chip, In-order P54C, very wide VPU (512-bit SSE), LRBni instructions (8× 64-bit) |
| x86-64 | 64-bit Extended since 2001 | 2013 | AMD Jaguar (Athlon, Sempron) | 48-bit | | | SoC, game console and low power smart device processor |
| x86-64 | 64-bit Extended since 2001 | 2013 | Intel Silvermont (Atom, Celeron, Pentium) | 36-bit | | | SoC, low/ultra-low power smart device processor |
| x86-64 | 64-bit Extended since 2001 | 2013 | Intel Core i3, Core i5 and Core i7 (Haswell/Broadwell) | 39-bit | | | AVX2, FMA3, TSX, BMI1, and BMI2 instructions, LGA 1150 socket |
| x86-64 | 64-bit Extended since 2001 | 2015 | Intel Broadwell-U (Intel Core i3, Core i5, Core i7, Core M, Pentium, Celeron) | 39-bit | | | SoC, on-chip Broadwell-U PCH-LP (Multi-chip module) |
| x86-64 | 64-bit Extended since 2001 | 2015–2020 | Intel Skylake/Kaby Lake/Cannon Lake/Coffee Lake/Rocket Lake (Intel Pentium/Celeron Gold, Core i3, Core i5, Core i7, Core i9) | 46-bit | | | AVX-512 (restricted to Cannon Lake-U and workstation/server variants of Skylake) |
| x86-64 | 64-bit Extended since 2001 | 2016 | Intel Xeon Phi (Knights Landing) | 48-bit | | | Manycore CPU and coprocessor for Xeon systems, Airmont (Atom) based core |
| x86-64 | 64-bit Extended since 2001 | 2016 | AMD Bristol Ridge (AMD (Pro) A6/A8/A10/A12) | 48-bit | | | Integrated FCH on die, SoC, AM4 socket |
| x86-64 | 64-bit Extended since 2001 | 2017 | AMD Ryzen Series/AMD Epyc Series | 48-bit | | | AMD's implementation of SMT, on-chip multiple dies |
| x86-64 | 64-bit Extended since 2001 | 2017 | Zhaoxin WuDaoKou (KX-5000, KH-20000) | 48-bit | | | Zhaoxin's first brand new x86-64 architecture |
| x86-64 | 64-bit Extended since 2001 | 2018–2021 | Intel Sunny Cove (Ice Lake-U and Y), Cypress Cove (Rocket Lake) | 57-bit | | | Intel's first implementation of AVX-512 for the consumer segment. Addition of Vector Neural Network Instructions (VNNI) |
| x86-64 | 64-bit Extended since 2001 | 2019 | AMD Matisse | 48-bit | | | Multiple Chip Module design with I/O die separate from CPU die(s), Support for PCIe Gen4 |
| x86-64 | 64-bit Extended since 2001 | 2020 | Intel Willow Cove (Tiger Lake-Y/U/H) | 57-bit | | | Dual ring interconnect architecture, updated Gaussian Neural Accelerator (GNA2), new AVX-512 Vector Intersection Instructions, addition of Control-Flow Enforcement Technology (CET) |
| x86-64 | 64-bit Extended since 2001 | 2021 | Intel Alder Lake | 57-bit | | | Hybrid design with performance (Golden Cove) and efficiency cores (Gracemont), support for PCIe Gen5 and DDR5, updated Gaussian Neural Accelerator (GNA3). AVX-512 not officially supported |
| x86-64 | 64-bit Extended since 2001 | 2022 | AMD Vermeer (5800X3D) | 48-bit | | | X3D chips have an additional 64MB 3D vertically stacked L3 cache (3D V-Cache) for up to 96MB L3 Cache |
| x86-64 | 64-bit Extended since 2001 | 2022 | AMD Raphael | 48-bit | | | AMD's first implementation of AVX-512 for the consumer segment, iGPU now standard on Ryzen CPU's with 2 RDNA 2 compute cores |

== History ==
=== Designers and manufacturers ===
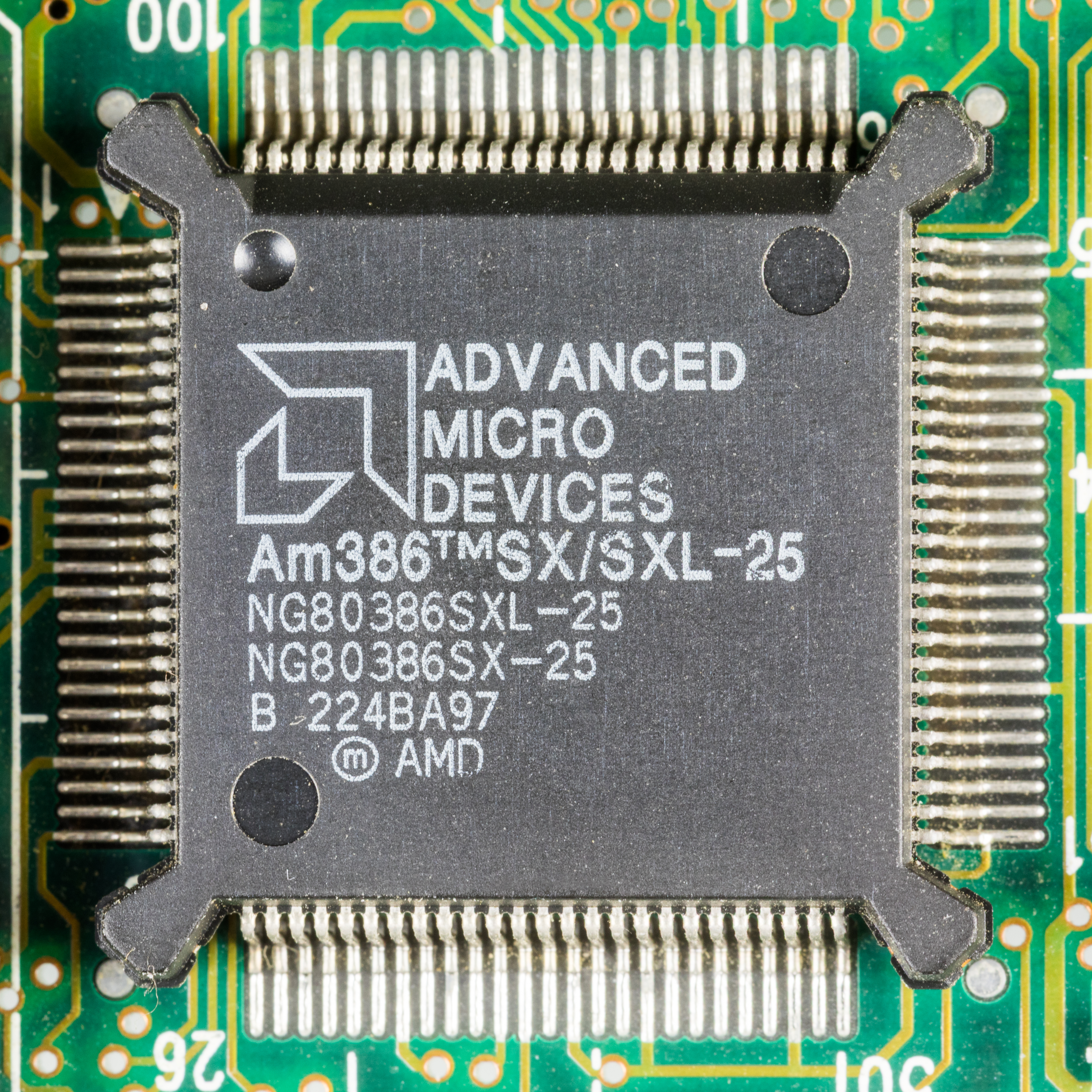
Am386, released by AMD in 1991

At various times, companies such as IBM, VIA, NEC, (Note: The NEC V20 and V30 also provided the older 8080 instruction set, allowing PCs equipped with these microprocessors to operate CP/M applications at full speed (i.e., without the need to simulate an 8080 by software).) AMD, TI, STM, Fujitsu, OKI, Siemens, Cyrix, Intersil, C&T, NexGen, UMC, and DM&P started to design or manufacture (Note: Fabless companies designed the chip and contracted another company to manufacture it, while fabbed companies would do both the design and the manufacturing themselves. Some companies started as fabbed manufacturers and later became fabless designers, one such example being AMD.) x86 processors (CPUs) intended for personal computers and embedded systems. Other companies that designed or manufactured x86 or x87 processors include ITT Corporation, National Semiconductor, ULSI System Technology, and Weitek.

Such x86 implementations were seldom simple copies but often employed different internal microarchitectures and different solutions at the electronic and physical levels. Quite naturally, early compatible microprocessors were 16-bit, while 32-bit designs were developed much later. For the personal computer market, real quantities started to appear around 1990 with i386 and i486 compatible processors, often named similarly to Intel's original chips.

After the fully pipelined i486, in 1993 Intel introduced the Pentium brand name (which, unlike numbers, could be trademarked) for their new set of superscalar x86 designs. With the x86 naming scheme now legally cleared, other x86 vendors had to choose different names for their x86-compatible products, and initially some chose to continue with variations of the numbering scheme: IBM partnered with Cyrix to produce the 5x86 and then the very efficient 6x86 (M1) and 6x86MX (MII) lines of Cyrix designs, which were the first x86 microprocessors implementing register renaming to enable speculative execution.

AMD meanwhile designed and manufactured the advanced but delayed 5k86 (K5), which, internally, was closely based on AMD's earlier 29K RISC design; similar to NexGen's Nx586, it used a strategy such that dedicated pipeline stages decode x86 instructions into uniform and easily handled micro-operations, a method that has remained the basis for most x86 designs to this day.

Some early versions of these microprocessors had heat dissipation problems. The 6x86 was also affected by a few minor compatibility problems, the Nx586 lacked a floating-point unit (FPU) and (the then crucial) pin-compatibility, while the K5 had somewhat disappointing performance when it was (eventually) introduced.

Customer ignorance of alternatives to the Pentium series further contributed to these designs being comparatively unsuccessful, despite the fact that the K5 had very good Pentium compatibility and the 6x86 was significantly faster than the Pentium on integer code. (Note: It had a slower FPU however, which is slightly ironic as Cyrix started out as a designer of fast floating-point units for x86 processors.) AMD later managed to grow into a serious contender with the K6 set of processors, which gave way to the very successful Athlon and Opteron.

There were also other contenders, such as Centaur Technology (formerly IDT), Rise Technology, and Transmeta. VIA Technologies' energy efficient C3 and C7 processors, which were designed by the Centaur company, were sold for many years following their release in 2005. Centaur's 2008 design, the VIA Nano, was their first processor with superscalar and speculative execution. It was introduced at about the same time (in 2008) as Intel introduced the Intel Atom, its first "in-order" processor after the P5 Pentium.

Many additions and extensions have been added to the original x86 instruction set over the years, almost consistently with full backward compatibility. (Note: Intel abandoned its "x86" naming scheme with the P5 Pentium during 1993 (as numbers could not be trademarked). However, the term x86 was already established among technicians, compiler writers etc.) The architecture family has been implemented in processors from Intel, Cyrix, AMD, VIA Technologies and many other companies; there are also open implementations, such as the Zet SoC platform (currently inactive). Nevertheless, of those, only Intel, AMD, VIA Technologies, and DM&P Electronics hold x86 architectural licenses, and from these, only the first two actively produce modern 64-bit designs, leading to what has been called a "duopoly" of Intel and AMD in x86 processors.

However, in 2014 the Shanghai-based Chinese company Zhaoxin, a joint venture between a Chinese company and VIA Technologies, began designing VIA based x86 processors for desktops and laptops. The release of its newest "7" family of x86 processors (e.g. KX-7000), which are not quite as fast as AMD or Intel chips but are still state of the art, had been planned for 2021; as of March 2022 the release had not taken place, however.

=== From 16-bit and 32-bit to 64-bit architecture ===
The instruction set architecture has twice been extended to a larger word size. In 1985, Intel released the 32-bit 80386 (later known as i386) which gradually replaced the earlier 16-bit chips in computers (although typically not in embedded systems) during the following years; this extended programming model was originally referred to as the i386 architecture (like its first implementation) but Intel later dubbed it IA-32 when introducing its (unrelated) IA-64 architecture.

In 1999–2003, AMD extended this 32-bit architecture to 64 bits and referred to it as x86-64 in early documents and later as AMD64. Intel soon adopted AMD's architectural extensions under the name IA-32e, later using the name EM64T and finally using Intel 64. Microsoft and Sun Microsystems/Oracle also use term "x64", while many Linux distributions, and the BSDs also use the "amd64" term. Microsoft Windows, for example, designates its 32-bit versions as "x86" and 64-bit versions as "x64", while installation files of 64-bit Windows versions are required to be placed into a directory called "AMD64".

==== Continued support for 16-bit and 32-bit execution modes ====
In 2023, Intel proposed a major change to the architecture referred to as X86S (formerly known as X86-S). The S in X86S stood for "simplification", which aimed to remove support for legacy execution modes and instructions.

A processor implementing this proposal would have lacked support for legacy mode, started execution directly in long mode and provided a way to switch to 5-level paging without going through the unpaged mode.

The new architecture would have removed support for 16-bit and 32-bit operating systems. 32-bit code would have only been supported for user applications running in ring 3, and would have used the same simplified segmentation as long mode.

Specific removed features would have included:

- Segmentation gates
- 32-bit ring 0
  - VT-x will no longer emulate this feature
- Rings 1 and 2
- Ring 3 I/O port (IN/OUT) access; see port-mapped I/O
- String port I/O (INS/OUTS)
- Real mode (including huge real mode), 16-bit protected mode, VM86
- 16-bit addressing mode
  - VT-x will no longer provide unrestricted mode
- 8259 support; the only APIC supported would be X2APIC
- Some unused operating system mode bits
- 16-bit and 32-bit Startup IPI (SIPI)

The draft specification received multiple updates, reaching version 1.2 by June 2024. It was eventually abandoned as of December 2024, following the formation of the x86 Ecosystem Advisory Group by Intel and AMD.

== Basic properties of the architecture ==
The x86 architecture is a variable instruction length, primarily "CISC" design with emphasis on backward compatibility. The instruction set is not typical CISC, however, but basically an extended version of the simple eight-bit 8008 and 8080 architectures. Byte-addressing is enabled and words are stored in memory with little-endian byte order. Memory access to unaligned addresses is allowed for almost all instructions. The largest native size for integer arithmetic and memory addresses (or offsets) is 16, 32 or 64 bits depending on architecture generation (newer processors include direct support for smaller integers as well). Multiple scalar values can be handled simultaneously via the SIMD unit present in later generations, as described below. (Note: 16-bit and 32-bit microprocessors were introduced during 1978 and 1985 respectively; plans for 64-bit was announced during 1999 and gradually introduced from 2003 and onwards.) Immediate addressing offsets and immediate data may be expressed as 8-bit quantities for the frequently occurring cases or contexts where a −128..127 range is enough. Typical instructions are therefore 2 or 3 bytes in length (although some are much longer, and some are single-byte).

To further conserve encoding space, most registers are expressed in opcodes using three or four bits, the latter via an opcode prefix in 64-bit mode, while at most one operand to an instruction can be a memory location. (Note: Some "CISC" designs, such as the PDP-11, may use two.) However, this memory operand may also be the destination (or a combined source and destination), while the other operand, the source, can be either register or immediate. Among other factors, this contributes to a code size that rivals eight-bit machines and enables efficient use of instruction cache memory. The relatively small number of general registers (also inherited from its 8-bit ancestors) has made register-relative addressing (using small immediate offsets) an important method of accessing operands, especially on the stack. Much work has therefore been invested in making such accesses as fast as register accesses—i.e., a one cycle instruction throughput, in most circumstances where the accessed data is available in the top-level cache.

=== Floating point and SIMD ===
A dedicated floating-point processor with 80-bit internal registers, the 8087, was developed for the original 8086. This microprocessor subsequently developed into the extended 80387, and later processors incorporated a backward compatible version of this functionality on the same microprocessor as the main processor. In addition to this, modern x86 designs also contain a SIMD-unit (see SSE below) where instructions can work in parallel on (one or two) 128-bit words, each containing two or four floating-point numbers (each 64 or 32 bits wide respectively), or alternatively, 2, 4, 8 or 16 integers (each 64, 32, 16 or 8 bits wide respectively).

The presence of wide SIMD registers means that existing x86 processors can load or store up to 128 bits of memory data in a single instruction and also perform bitwise operations (although not integer arithmetic (Note: That is because integer arithmetic generates carry between subsequent bits (unlike simple bitwise operations).)) on full 128-bits quantities in parallel. Intel's Sandy Bridge processors added the Advanced Vector Extensions (AVX) instructions, widening the SIMD registers to 256 bits. The Intel Initial Many Core Instructions implemented by the Knights Corner Xeon Phi processors, and the AVX-512 instructions implemented by the Knights Landing Xeon Phi processors and by Skylake-X processors, use 512-bit wide SIMD registers.

== Current implementations ==
During execution, current x86 processors employ a few extra decoding steps to split most instructions into smaller pieces called micro-operations. These are then handed to a control unit that buffers and schedules them in compliance with x86-semantics so that they can be executed, partly in parallel, by one of several (more or less specialized) execution units. These modern x86 designs are thus pipelined, superscalar, and also capable of out of order and speculative execution (via branch prediction, register renaming, and memory dependence prediction), which means they may execute multiple (partial or complete) x86 instructions simultaneously, and not necessarily in the same order as given in the instruction stream. Some Intel CPUs (Xeon Foster MP, some Pentium 4, and some Nehalem and later Intel Core processors) and AMD CPUs (starting from Zen) are also capable of simultaneous multithreading with two threads per core (Xeon Phi has four threads per core). Some Intel CPUs support transactional memory (TSX).

When introduced, in the mid-1990s, this method was sometimes referred to as a "RISC core" or as "RISC translation", partly for marketing reasons, but also because these micro-operations share some properties with certain types of RISC instructions. However, traditional microcode (used since the 1950s) also inherently shares many of the same properties; the new method differs mainly in that the translation to micro-operations now occurs asynchronously. Not having to synchronize the execution units with the decode steps opens up possibilities for more analysis of the (buffered) code stream, and therefore permits detection of operations that can be performed in parallel, simultaneously feeding more than one execution unit.

The latest processors also do the opposite when appropriate; they combine certain x86 sequences (such as a compare followed by a conditional jump) into a more complex micro-op which fits the execution model better and thus can be executed faster or with fewer machine resources involved.

Another way to try to improve performance is to cache the decoded micro-operations, so the processor can directly access the decoded micro-operations from a special cache, instead of decoding them again. Intel followed this approach with the Execution Trace Cache feature in their NetBurst microarchitecture (for Pentium 4 processors) and later in the Decoded Stream Buffer (for Core-branded processors since Sandy Bridge).

Transmeta used a completely different method in their Crusoe x86 compatible CPUs. They used just-in-time translation to convert x86 instructions to the CPU's native VLIW instruction set. Transmeta argued that their approach allows for more power efficient designs since the CPU can forgo the complicated decode step of more traditional x86 implementations.

== Addressing modes ==
Addressing modes for 16-bit processor modes can be summarized by the formula:

$$\begin{matrix}
\mathtt{CS}: \\ \mathtt{DS}: \\ \mathtt{SS}: \\ \mathtt{ES}:
\end{matrix}\ \
\begin{matrix} \\
\begin{bmatrix}
\mathtt{BX} \\ \mathtt{BP}
\end{bmatrix}
+
\begin{bmatrix}
\mathtt{SI} \\ \mathtt{DI}
\end{bmatrix} \\ \\
\end{matrix}
+
\rm displacement$$

Addressing modes for 32-bit x86 processor modes can be summarized by the formula:

$$\begin{matrix}
\mathtt{CS}: \\ \mathtt{DS}: \\ \mathtt{SS}: \\ \mathtt{ES}: \\ \mathtt{FS}: \\ \mathtt{GS}:
\end{matrix}\ \
\begin{bmatrix}
\mathtt{EAX} \\ \mathtt{EBX} \\ \mathtt{ECX} \\ \mathtt{EDX} \\ \mathtt{ESP} \\ \mathtt{EBP} \\ \mathtt{ESI} \\ \mathtt{EDI}
\end{bmatrix}
+
\begin{pmatrix}\\
\begin{bmatrix}
\mathtt{EAX} \\ \mathtt{EBX} \\ \mathtt{ECX} \\ \mathtt{EDX} \\ \mathtt{EBP} \\ \mathtt{ESI} \\ \mathtt{EDI}
\end{bmatrix}
*
\begin{bmatrix}
1 \\ 2 \\ 4 \\ 8
\end{bmatrix} \\ \\
\end{pmatrix}
+
\rm displacement$$

Addressing modes for the 64-bit processor mode can be summarized by the formula:

$$\begin{Bmatrix} \\
\begin{matrix}
\mathtt{FS}: \\ \mathtt{GS}:
\end{matrix}\ \
\begin{bmatrix}
\vdots \\
\mathtt{GPR} \\
\vdots
\end{bmatrix}
+
\begin{pmatrix} \\
\begin{bmatrix}
\vdots \\
\mathtt{GPR} \\
\vdots \\
\end{bmatrix}
*
\begin{bmatrix}
1\\2\\4\\8
\end{bmatrix} \\ \\
\end{pmatrix} \\ \\
\hline \\
\begin{matrix}
\mathtt{RIP}
\end{matrix} \\ \\
\end{Bmatrix}
+
\rm displacement$$

Instruction relative addressing in 64-bit code (RIP + displacement, where RIP is the instruction pointer register) simplifies the implementation of position-independent code (as used in shared libraries in some operating systems).

== x86 registers ==
=== 16-bit ===
The original Intel 8086 and 8088 have fourteen 16-bit registers. Four of them (AX, BX, CX, DX) are general-purpose registers (GPRs), although each may have an additional purpose; for example, only CX can be used as a counter with the loop instruction. Each can be accessed as two separate bytes (thus BX's high byte can be accessed as BH and low byte as BL). Two pointer registers have special roles: SP (stack pointer) points to the "top" of the stack, and BP (base pointer) is often used to point at some other place in the stack, typically above the local variables (see frame pointer). The registers SI, DI, BX and BP are address registers, and may also be used for array indexing.

One of four possible "segment registers" (CS, DS, SS and ES) is used to form a memory address. In the original 8086 / 8088 / 80186 / 80188 every address was built from a segment register and one of the general purpose registers. For example, ds:si is the notation for an address formed as [16 * ds + si] to allow 20-bit addressing rather than 16 bits, although this changed in later processors. At that time only certain combinations were supported.

The FLAGS register contains flags such as carry flag, overflow flag and zero flag. Finally, the instruction pointer (IP) points to the next instruction that will be fetched from memory and then executed; this register cannot be directly accessed (read or written) by a program.

The 8086 has 64 KB of eight-bit (or alternatively 32 K-word of 16-bit) I/O space, and a 64 KB (one segment) stack in memory supported by computer hardware. Only words (two bytes) can be pushed to the stack. The stack grows toward numerically lower addresses, with SS:SP pointing to the most recently pushed item. There are 256 interrupts, which can be invoked by both hardware and software. The interrupts can cascade, using the stack to store the status and return address.

The Intel 80186 and 80188 are essentially an upgraded 8086 or 8088 CPU, respectively, with on-chip peripherals added, and they have the same CPU registers as the 8086 and 8088 (in addition to interface registers for the peripherals).

The 8086, 8088, 80186, and 80188 can use an optional floating-point coprocessor, the 8087. The 8087 appears to the programmer as part of the CPU and adds eight 80-bit wide registers, st(0) to st(7), each of which can hold numeric data in one of seven formats: 32-, 64-, or 80-bit floating point, 16-, 32-, or 64-bit (binary) integer, and 80-bit packed decimal integer. It also has its own 16-bit status register accessible through the fstsw instruction, and it is common to simply use some of its bits for branching by copying it into the normal FLAGS.

In the Intel 80286, to support protected mode, three special registers hold descriptor table addresses (GDTR, LDTR, IDTR), and a fourth task register (TR) is used for task switching. The 80287 is the floating-point coprocessor for the 80286 and has the same registers as the 8087 with the same data formats.

=== 32-bit ===
Registers available in the x86-64 instruction set

With the advent of the 32-bit 80386 processor, the 16-bit general-purpose registers, base registers, index registers, instruction pointer, and FLAGS register, but not the segment registers, were expanded to 32 bits. The nomenclature represented this by prefixing an "E" (for "extended") to the register names in x86 assembly language. Thus, the AX register corresponds to the lower 16 bits of the new 32-bit EAX register, SI corresponds to the lower 16 bits of ESI, and so on. The general-purpose registers, base registers, and index registers can all be used as the base in addressing modes, and all of those registers except for the stack pointer can be used as the index in addressing modes.

Two new segment registers (FS and GS) were added. With a greater number of registers, instructions and operands, the machine code format was expanded. To provide backward compatibility, segments with executable code can be marked as containing either 16-bit or 32-bit instructions. Special prefixes allow inclusion of 32-bit instructions in a 16-bit segment or vice versa.

The 80386 had an optional floating-point coprocessor, the 80387; it had eight 80-bit wide registers: st(0) to st(7), like the 8087 and 80287. The 80386 could also use an 80287 coprocessor. The 80486 was available with an on-chip floating-point processing unit (FPU) and without it. All subsequent x86 models have the FPU on-chip.

The Pentium MMX added eight 64-bit MMX integer vector registers (MM0 to MM7, which share lower bits with the 80-bit-wide FPU stack). With the Pentium III, Intel added a 32-bit Streaming SIMD Extensions (SSE) control/status register (MXCSR) and eight 128-bit SSE floating-point registers (XMM0 to XMM7).

=== 64-bit ===
Starting with the AMD Opteron processor, the x86 architecture extended the 32-bit registers into 64-bit registers in a way similar to how the 16 to 32-bit extension took place. An R-prefix (for "register") identifies the 64-bit registers (RAX, RBX, RCX, RDX, RSI, RDI, RBP, RSP, RFLAGS, RIP), and eight additional 64-bit general registers (R8–R15) were also introduced in the creation of x86-64. Also, eight more SSE vector registers (XMM8–XMM15) were added. However, these extensions are only usable in 64-bit mode, which is one of the two modes only available in long mode. The addressing modes were not dramatically changed from 32-bit mode, except that addressing was extended to 64 bits, virtual addresses are now sign extended to 64 bits (in order to disallow mode bits in virtual addresses), and other selector details were dramatically reduced. In addition, an addressing mode was added to allow memory references relative to RIP (the instruction pointer), to ease the implementation of position-independent code, used in shared libraries in some operating systems.

=== 128-bit ===
SIMD registers XMM0–XMM15 (XMM0–XMM31 when AVX-512 is supported).

=== 256-bit ===
SIMD registers YMM0–YMM15 (YMM0–YMM31 when AVX-512 is supported). Lower half of each of the YMM registers maps onto the corresponding XMM register.

=== 512-bit ===
SIMD registers ZMM0–ZMM31. Lower half of each of the ZMM registers maps onto the corresponding YMM register.

=== Miscellaneous/special purpose ===
x86 processors that have a protected mode, i.e. the 80286 and later processors, also have three descriptor registers (GDTR, LDTR, IDTR) and a task register (TR).

32-bit x86 processors (starting with the 80386) also include various special/miscellaneous registers such as control registers (CR0 through 4, CR8 for 64-bit only), debug registers (DR0 through 3, plus 6 and 7), test registers (TR3 through 7; 80486 only), and model-specific registers (MSRs, appearing with the Pentium (Note: Two MSRs of particular interest are SYSENTER_EIP_MSR and SYSENTER_ESP_MSR, introduced on the Pentium® II processor, which store the address of the kernel mode system service handler and corresponding kernel stack pointer. Initialized during system startup, SYSENTER_EIP_MSR and SYSENTER_ESP_MSR are used by the SYSENTER (Intel) or SYSCALL (AMD) instructions to achieve Fast System Calls, about three times faster than the software interrupt method used previously.)).

AVX-512 has eight extra 64-bit mask registers K0–K7 for selecting elements in a vector register. Depending on the vector register and element widths, only a subset of bits of the mask register may be used by a given instruction.

=== Purpose ===
Although the main registers (with the exception of the instruction pointer) are "general-purpose" in the 32-bit and 64-bit versions of the instruction set and can be used for anything, it was originally envisioned that they be used for the following purposes:

- AL/AH/AX/EAX/RAX: Accumulator
- CL/CH/CX/ECX/RCX: Counter (for use with loops and strings)
- DL/DH/DX/EDX/RDX: Extend the precision of the accumulator (e.g. combine 32-bit EAX and EDX for 64-bit integer operations in 32-bit code)
- BL/BH/BX/EBX/RBX: Base index (for use with arrays)
- SP/ESP/RSP: Stack pointer for top address of the stack.
- BP/EBP/RBP: Stack base pointer for holding the address of the current stack frame.
- SI/ESI/RSI: Source index for string operations.
- DI/EDI/RDI: Destination index for string operations.
- IP/EIP/RIP: Instruction pointer. Holds the program counter, the address of next instruction.

Segment registers:

- CS: Code
- DS: Data
- SS: Stack
- ES: Extra data
- FS: Extra data #2
- GS: Extra data #3

No particular purposes were envisioned for the other 8 registers available only in 64-bit mode.

Some instructions compile and execute more efficiently when using these registers for their designed purpose. For example, using AL as an accumulator and adding an immediate byte value to it produces the efficient add to AL opcode of 04h, whilst using the BL register produces the generic and longer add to register opcode of 80C3h. Another example is double precision division and multiplication that works specifically with the AX and DX registers.

Modern compilers benefited from the introduction of the sib byte (scale-index-base byte) that allows registers to be treated uniformly (minicomputer-like). However, using the sib byte universally is non-optimal, as it produces longer encodings than only using it selectively when necessary. (The main benefit of the sib byte is the orthogonality and more powerful addressing modes it provides, which make it possible to save instructions and the use of registers for address calculations such as scaling an index.) Some special instructions lost priority in the hardware design and became slower than equivalent small code sequences. A notable example is the LODSW instruction.

=== Structure ===
General Purpose Registers (A, B, C and D)
| 64 | 56 | 48 | 40 | 32 | 24 | 16 | 8 |
|---|---|---|---|---|---|---|---|
R?X
| | | | | E?X | | | |
| | | | | | | ?X | |
| | | | | | | ?H | ?L |

64-bit mode-only General Purpose Registers (R8, R9, R10, R11, R12, R13, R14, R15)
| 64 | 56 | 48 | 40 | 32 | 24 | 16 | 8 |
|---|---|---|---|---|---|---|---|
?
| | | | | ?D | | | |
| | | | | | | ?W | |
| | | | | | | | ?B |

Segment Registers (C, D, S, E, F and G)
| 16 | 8 |
|---|---|
?S

Pointer Registers (S and B)
| 64 | 56 | 48 | 40 | 32 | 24 | 16 | 8 |
|---|---|---|---|---|---|---|---|
R?P
| | | | | E?P | | | |
| | | | | | | ?P | |
| | | | | | | | ?PL |

Note: The ?PL registers are only available in 64-bit mode.

Index Registers (S and D)
| 64 | 56 | 48 | 40 | 32 | 24 | 16 | 8 |
|---|---|---|---|---|---|---|---|
R?I
| | | | | E?I | | | |
| | | | | | | ?I | |
| | | | | | | | ?IL |

Note: The ?IL registers are only available in 64-bit mode.

Instruction Pointer Register (I)
| 64 | 56 | 48 | 40 | 32 | 24 | 16 | 8 |
|---|---|---|---|---|---|---|---|
RIP
| | | | | EIP | | | |
| | | | | | | IP | |

== Operating modes ==
=== Real mode ===
Real Address mode, commonly called Real mode, is an operating mode of 8086 and later x86-compatible CPUs. Real mode is characterized by a 20-bit segmented memory address space (meaning that only slightly more than 1 MiB of memory can be addressed (Note: Because a segmented address is the sum of a 16-bit segment multiplied by 16 and a 16-bit offset, the maximum address is 1,114,095 (10FFEF hex), for an addressability of 1,114,096 bytes = 1 MB + 65,520 bytes. Before the 80286, x86 CPUs had only 20 physical address lines (address bit signals), so the 21st bit of the address, bit 20, was dropped and addresses past 1 MB were mirrors of the low end of the address space (starting from address zero). Since the 80286, all x86 CPUs have at least 24 physical address lines, and bit 20 of the computed address is brought out onto the address bus in real mode, allowing the CPU to address the full 1,114,096 bytes reachable with an x86 segmented address. On the popular IBM PC platform, switchable hardware to disable the 21st address bit was added to machines with an 80286 or later so that all programs designed for 8088/8086-based models could run, while newer software could take advantage of the "high" memory in real mode and the full 16 MB or larger address space in protected mode—see A20 gate.)), direct software access to peripheral hardware, and no concept of memory protection or multitasking at the hardware level. All x86 CPUs in the 80286 series and later start up in real mode at power-on; 80186 CPUs and earlier had only one operational mode, which is equivalent to real mode in later chips. (On the IBM PC platform, direct software access to the IBM BIOS routines is available only in real mode, since BIOS is written for real mode. However, this is not a property of the x86 CPU but of the IBM BIOS design.)

In order to use more than 64 KB of memory, the segment registers must be used. This created great complications for compiler implementors who introduced odd pointer modes such as "near", "far" and "huge" to leverage the implicit nature of segmented architecture to different degrees, with some pointers containing 16-bit offsets within implied segments and other pointers containing segment addresses and offsets within segments. It is technically possible to use up to 256 KB of memory for code and data, with up to 64 KB for code, by setting all four segment registers once and then only using 16-bit offsets (optionally with default-segment override prefixes) to address memory, but this puts substantial restrictions on the way data can be addressed and memory operands can be combined, and it violates the architectural intent of the Intel designers, which is for separate data items (e.g. arrays, structures, code units) to be contained in separate segments and addressed by their own segment addresses, in new programs that are not ported from earlier 8-bit processors with 16-bit address spaces.

=== Unreal mode ===
Unreal mode is used by some 16-bit operating systems and some 32-bit boot loaders.

=== System Management Mode ===
The System Management Mode (SMM) is only used by the system firmware (BIOS/UEFI), not by operating systems and applications software. The SMM code is running in SMRAM.

=== Protected mode ===
In addition to real mode, the Intel 80286 supports protected mode, expanding addressable physical memory to 16 MB and addressable virtual memory to 1 GB, and providing protected memory, which prevents programs from corrupting one another. This is done by using the segment registers only for storing an index into a descriptor table that is stored in memory. There are two such tables, the Global Descriptor Table (GDT) and the Local Descriptor Table (LDT), each holding up to 8192 segment descriptors, each segment giving access to 64 KB of memory. In the 80286, a segment descriptor provides a 24-bit base address, and this base address is added to a 16-bit offset to create an absolute address. The base address from the table fulfills the same role that the literal value of the segment register fulfills in real mode; the segment registers have been converted from direct registers to indirect registers. Each segment can be assigned one of four ring levels used for hardware-based computer security. Each segment descriptor also contains a segment limit field which specifies the maximum offset that may be used with the segment. Because offsets are 16 bits, segments are still limited to 64 KB each in 80286 protected mode.

Each time a segment register is loaded in protected mode, the 80286 must read a 6-byte segment descriptor from memory into a set of hidden internal registers. Thus, loading segment registers is much slower in protected mode than in real mode, and changing segments very frequently is to be avoided. Actual memory operations using protected mode segments are not slowed much because the 80286 and later have hardware to check the offset against the segment limit in parallel with instruction execution.

The Intel 80386 extended offsets and also the segment limit field in each segment descriptor to 32 bits, enabling a segment to span the entire memory space. It also introduced support in protected mode for paging, a mechanism making it possible to use paged virtual memory (with 4 KB page size). Paging allows the CPU to map any page of the virtual memory space to any page of the physical memory space. To do this, it uses additional mapping tables in memory called page tables. Protected mode on the 80386 can operate with paging either enabled or disabled; the segmentation mechanism is always active and generates virtual addresses that are then mapped by the paging mechanism if it is enabled. The segmentation mechanism can also be effectively disabled by setting all segments to have a base address of 0 and size limit equal to the whole address space; this also requires a minimally-sized segment descriptor table of only four descriptors (since the FS and GS segments need not be used). (Note: An extra descriptor record at the top of the table is also required, because the table starts at zero but the minimum descriptor index that can be loaded into a segment register is 1; the value 0 is reserved to represent a segment register that points to no segment.)

Paging is used extensively by modern multitasking operating systems. Linux, 386BSD and Windows NT were developed for the 386 because it was the first Intel architecture CPU to support paging and 32-bit segment offsets. The 386 architecture became the basis of all further development in the x86 series.

x86 processors that support protected mode boot into real mode for backward compatibility with the older 8086 class of processors. Upon power-on (a.k.a. booting), the processor initializes in real mode, and then begins executing instructions. Operating system boot code, which might be stored in read-only memory, may place the processor into the protected mode to enable paging and other features. Conversely, segment arithmetic, a common practice in real mode code, is not allowed in protected mode.

==== Virtual 8086 mode ====
There is also a sub-mode of operation in 32-bit protected mode (a.k.a. 80386 protected mode) called virtual 8086 mode, also known as V86 mode. This is basically a special hybrid operating mode that allows real mode programs and operating systems to run while under the control of a protected mode supervisor operating system. This allows for a great deal of flexibility in running both protected mode programs and real mode programs simultaneously. This mode is exclusively available for the 32-bit version of protected mode; it does not exist in the 16-bit version of protected mode, or in long mode.

=== Long mode ===
In the mid-1990s, it was obvious that the 32-bit address space of the x86 architecture was limiting its performance in applications requiring large data sets. A 32-bit address space would allow the processor to directly address only 4 GB of data, a size surpassed by applications such as video processing and database engines. Using 64-bit addresses, it is possible to directly address 16 EiB of data, although most 64-bit architectures do not support access to the full 64-bit address space; for example, AMD64 supports only 48 bits from a 64-bit address, split into four paging levels.

In 1999, AMD published a (nearly) complete specification for a 64-bit extension of the x86 architecture which they called x86-64 with claimed intentions to produce. That design is currently used in almost all x86 processors, with some exceptions intended for embedded systems.

Mass-produced x86-64 chips for the general market were available four years later, in 2003, after the time was spent for working prototypes to be tested and refined; about the same time, the initial name x86-64 was changed to AMD64. The success of the AMD64 line of processors coupled with lukewarm reception of the IA-64 architecture forced Intel to release its own implementation of the AMD64 instruction set. Intel had previously implemented support for AMD64 but opted not to enable it in hopes that AMD would not bring AMD64 to market before Itanium's new IA-64 instruction set was widely adopted. It branded its implementation of AMD64 as EM64T, and later rebranded it Intel 64.

In its literature and product version names, Microsoft and Sun refer to AMD64/Intel 64 collectively as x64 in the Windows and Solaris operating systems. Linux distributions refer to it either as "x86-64", its variant "x86_64", or "amd64". BSD systems use "amd64" while macOS uses "x86_64".

Long mode is mostly an extension of the 32-bit instruction set, but unlike the 16–to–32-bit transition, many instructions were dropped in the 64-bit mode. This does not affect actual binary backward compatibility (which would execute legacy code in other modes that retain support for those instructions), but it changes the way assembler and compilers for new code have to work.

This was the first time that a major extension of the x86 architecture was initiated and originated by a manufacturer other than Intel. It was also the first time that Intel accepted technology of this nature from an outside source.

== Extensions ==
=== x87 ===
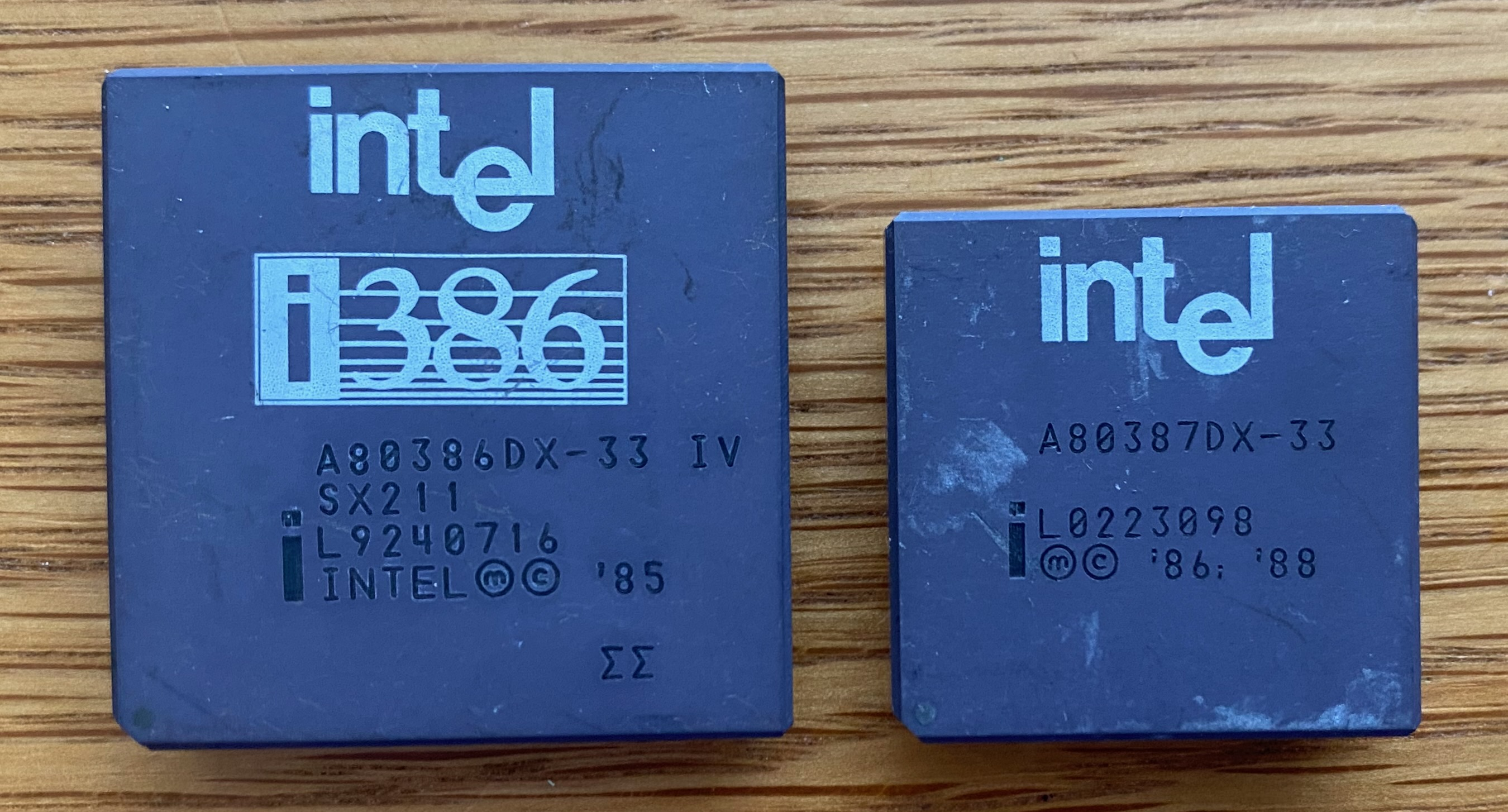
An Intel 386 with the 387 co-processor

Early x86 processors could be extended with floating-point hardware in the form of a series of floating-point numerical co-processors with names like 8087, 80287 and 80387, abbreviated x87. This was also known as the NPX (Numeric Processor eXtension), an apt name since the coprocessors, while used mainly for floating-point calculations, also performed integer operations on both binary and decimal formats. With very few exceptions, the 80486 and subsequent x86 processors then integrated this x87 functionality on chip which made the x87 instructions a de facto integral part of the x86 instruction set.

Each x87 register, known as ST(0) through ST(7), is 80 bits wide and stores numbers in the IEEE floating-point standard double extended precision format. These registers are organized as a stack with ST(0) as the top. This was done in order to conserve opcode space, and the registers are therefore randomly accessible only for either operand in a register-to-register instruction; ST0 must always be one of the two operands, either the source or the destination, regardless of whether the other operand is ST(x) or a memory operand. However, random access to the stack registers can be obtained through an instruction which exchanges any specified ST(x) with ST(0).

The operations include arithmetic and transcendental functions, including trigonometric and exponential functions, and instructions that load common constants (such as 0; 1; e, the base of the natural logarithm; log2(10); and log10(2)) into one of the stack registers. While the integer ability is often overlooked, the x87 can operate on larger integers with a single instruction than the 8086, 80286, 80386, or any x86 CPU without to 64-bit extensions can, and repeated integer calculations even on small values (e.g., 16-bit) can be accelerated by executing integer instructions on the x86 CPU and the x87 in parallel. (The x86 CPU keeps running while the x87 coprocessor calculates, and the x87 sets a signal to the x86 when it is finished or interrupts the x86 if it needs attention because of an error.)

=== PAE ===
The Physical Address Extension (PAE) was first added in the Intel Pentium Pro, and later by AMD in the Athlon processors, to allow up to 64 GB of RAM to be addressed. Without PAE, physical RAM in 32-bit protected mode is usually limited to 4 GB. PAE defines a different page table structure with wider page table entries and a third level of page table, allowing additional bits of physical address. Although the initial implementations on 32-bit processors theoretically supported up to 64 GB of RAM, chipset and other platform limitations often restricted what could actually be used. x86-64 processors define page table structures that theoretically allow up to 52 bits of physical address, although again, chipset and other platform concerns (like the number of DIMM slots available, and the maximum RAM possible per DIMM) prevent such a large physical address space to be realized. On x86-64 processors PAE mode must be active before the switch to long mode, and must remain active while long mode is active, so while in long mode there is no "non-PAE" mode. PAE mode does not affect the width of linear or virtual addresses.

=== MMX ===
MMX is a SIMD instruction set designed by Intel and introduced in 1997 for the Pentium MMX microprocessor. The MMX instruction set was developed from a similar concept first used on the Intel i860. It is supported on most subsequent IA-32 processors by Intel and other vendors. MMX is typically used for video processing (in multimedia applications, for instance).

MMX added 8 new registers to the architecture, known as MM0 through MM7 (henceforth referred to as MMn). In reality, these new registers were just aliases for the existing x87 FPU stack registers. Hence, anything that was done to the floating-point stack would also affect the MMX registers. Unlike the FP stack, these MMn registers were fixed, not relative, and therefore they were randomly accessible. The instruction set did not adopt the stack-like semantics so that existing operating systems could still correctly save and restore the register state when multitasking without modifications.

Each of the MMn registers are 64-bit integers. However, one of the main concepts of the MMX instruction set is the concept of packed data types, which means instead of using the whole register for a single 64-bit integer (quadword), one may use it to contain two 32-bit integers (doubleword), four 16-bit integers (word) or eight 8-bit integers (byte). Given that the MMX's 64-bit MMn registers are aliased to the FPU stack and each of the floating-point registers are 80 bits wide, the upper 16 bits of the floating-point registers are unused in MMX. These bits are set to all ones by any MMX instruction, which correspond to the floating-point representation of NaNs or infinities.

=== 3DNow! ===
In 1997, AMD introduced 3DNow!. The introduction of this technology coincided with the rise of 3D entertainment applications and was designed to improve the CPU's vector processing performance of graphic-intensive applications. 3D video game developers and 3D graphics hardware vendors use 3DNow! to enhance their performance on AMD's K6 and Athlon series of processors.

3DNow! was designed to be the natural evolution of MMX from integers to floating point. As such, it uses exactly the same register naming convention as MMX, that is MM0 through MM7. The only difference is that instead of packing integers into these registers, two single-precision floating-point numbers are packed into each register. The advantage of aliasing the FPU registers is that the same instruction and data structures used to save the state of the FPU registers can also be used to save 3DNow! register states. Thus no special modifications are required to be made to operating systems which would otherwise not know about them.

=== SSE ===
In 1999, Intel introduced the Streaming SIMD Extensions (SSE) instruction set, following in 2000 with SSE2. The first addition allowed offloading of basic floating-point operations from the x87 stack and the second made MMX almost obsolete and allowed the instructions to be realistically targeted by conventional compilers. Introduced in 2004 along with the Prescott revision of the Pentium 4 processor, SSE3 added specific memory and thread-handling instructions to boost the performance of Intel's HyperThreading technology. AMD licensed the SSE3 instruction set and implemented most of the SSE3 instructions for its revision E and later Athlon 64 processors. The Athlon 64 does not support HyperThreading and lacks those SSE3 instructions used only for HyperThreading.

SSE discarded all legacy connections to the FPU stack. This also meant that this instruction set discarded all legacy connections to previous generations of SIMD instruction sets like MMX. But it freed the designers up, allowing them to use larger registers, not limited by the size of the FPU registers. The designers created eight 128-bit registers, named XMM0 through XMM7. (In AMD64, the number of SSE XMM registers has been increased from 8 to 16.) However, the downside was that operating systems had to have an awareness of this new set of instructions in order to be able to save their register states. So Intel created a slightly modified version of Protected mode, called Enhanced mode which enables the usage of SSE instructions, whereas they stay disabled in regular Protected mode. An OS that is aware of SSE will activate Enhanced mode, whereas an unaware OS will only enter into traditional Protected mode.

SSE is a SIMD instruction set that works only on floating-point values, like 3DNow!. However, unlike 3DNow! it severs all legacy connection to the FPU stack. Because it has larger registers than 3DNow!, SSE can pack twice the number of single precision floats into its registers. The original SSE was limited to only single-precision numbers, like 3DNow!. The SSE2 introduced the capability to pack double precision numbers too, which 3DNow! had no possibility of doing since a double precision number is 64-bit in size which would be the full size of a single 3DNow! MMn register. At 128 bits, the SSE XMMn registers could pack two double precision floats into one register. Thus SSE2 is much more suitable for scientific calculations than either SSE1 or 3DNow!, which were limited to only single precision. SSE3 does not introduce any additional registers.

=== x86-64 ===
In supercomputer clusters (as tracked by TOP 500 data and visualized on the diagram above, last updated 2013), the appearance of 64-bit extensions for the x86 architecture enabled 64-bit x86 processors by AMD and Intel (teal hatched and blue hatched, in the diagram, respectively) to replace most RISC processor architectures previously used in such systems (including PA-RISC, SPARC, Alpha, and others), and 32-bit x86 (green on the diagram), even though Intel initially tried unsuccessfully to replace x86 with a new incompatible 64-bit architecture in the Itanium processor. The main non-x86 architecture which is still used, as of 2014, in supercomputing clusters is the Power ISA used by IBM Power microprocessors (blue with diamond tiling in the diagram), with SPARC as a distant second.

By the 2000s, 32-bit x86 processors' limits in memory addressing were an obstacle to their use in high-performance computing clusters and powerful desktop workstations. The aged 32-bit x86 was competing with much more advanced 64-bit RISC architectures which could address much more memory. Intel and the whole x86 ecosystem needed 64-bit memory addressing if x86 was to survive the 64-bit computing era, as workstation and desktop software applications were soon to start hitting the limits of 32-bit memory addressing. However, Intel felt that it was the right time to make a bold step and use the transition to 64-bit desktop computers for a transition away from the x86 architecture in general, an experiment which ultimately failed.

In 2001, Intel attempted to introduce a non-x86 64-bit architecture named IA-64 in its Itanium processor, initially aiming for the high-performance computing market, hoping that it would eventually replace the 32-bit x86. While IA-64 was incompatible with x86, the Itanium processor did provide emulation abilities for translating x86 instructions into IA-64, but this affected the performance of x86 programs so badly that it was rarely, if ever, actually useful to the users: programmers should rewrite x86 programs for the IA-64 architecture or their performance on Itanium would be orders of magnitude worse than on a true x86 processor. The market rejected the Itanium processor since it broke backward compatibility and preferred to continue using x86 chips, and very few programs were rewritten for IA-64.

AMD decided to take another path toward 64-bit memory addressing, making sure backward compatibility would not suffer. In April 2003, AMD released the first x86 processor with 64-bit general-purpose registers, the Opteron, capable of addressing much more than 4 GB of virtual memory using the new x86-64 extension (also known as AMD64 or x64). The 64-bit extensions to the x86 architecture were enabled only in the newly introduced long mode, therefore 32-bit and 16-bit applications and operating systems could simply continue using an AMD64 processor in protected or other modes, without even the slightest sacrifice of performance and with full compatibility back to the original instructions of the 16-bit Intel 8086. The market responded positively, adopting the 64-bit AMD processors for both high-performance applications and business or home computers.

Seeing the market rejecting the incompatible Itanium processor and Microsoft supporting AMD64, Intel had to respond and introduced its own x86-64 processor, the Prescott Pentium 4, in July 2004. As a result, the Itanium processor with its IA-64 instruction set is rarely used and x86, through its x86-64 incarnation, is still the dominant CPU architecture in non-embedded computers.

x86-64 also introduced the NX bit, which offers some protection against security bugs caused by buffer overruns.

As a result of AMD's 64-bit contribution to the x86 lineage and its subsequent acceptance by Intel, the 64-bit RISC architectures ceased to be a threat to the x86 ecosystem and almost disappeared from the workstation market. x86-64 began to be utilized in powerful supercomputers (in its AMD Opteron and Intel Xeon incarnations), a market which was previously the natural habitat for 64-bit RISC designs (such as the IBM Power microprocessors or SPARC processors). The great leap toward 64-bit computing and the maintenance of backward compatibility with 32-bit and 16-bit software enabled the x86 architecture to become an extremely flexible platform today, with x86 chips being utilized from small low-power systems (for example, Intel Quark and Intel Atom) to fast gaming desktop computers (for example, Intel Core i7 and AMD FX/Ryzen), and even dominate large supercomputing clusters, effectively leaving only the ARM 32-bit and 64-bit RISC architecture as a competitor in the smartphone and tablet market.

=== AMD-V and VT-x ===
Prior to 2005, x86 architecture processors were unable to meet the Popek and Goldberg virtualization requirements – a set of conditions for efficient virtualization created in 1974 by Gerald J. Popek and Robert P. Goldberg. However, both proprietary and open-source x86 virtualization hypervisor products were developed using software-based virtualization. Proprietary systems include Hyper-V, Parallels Workstation, VMware ESX, VMware Workstation, VMware Workstation Player and Windows Virtual PC, while free and open-source systems include QEMU, Kernel-based Virtual Machine, VirtualBox, and Xen.

The introduction of the AMD-V and Intel VT-x instruction sets in 2005 allowed x86 processors to meet the Popek and Goldberg virtualization requirements.

=== AES-NI ===
The Advanced Encryption Standard New Instructions (AES-NI) instruction set extension is designed to accelerate AES encryption and decryption operations. It was first proposed by Intel in 2008.

=== AVX ===
The Advanced Vector Extensions (AVX) doubled the size of SSE registers to 256-bit YMM registers. It also introduced the VEX coding scheme to accommodate the larger registers, plus a few instructions to permute elements. AVX2 did not introduce extra registers, but was notable for the addition for masking, gather, and shuffle instructions.

AVX-512 features yet another expansion to 32 512-bit ZMM registers and a new EVEX scheme. Unlike its predecessors featuring a monolithic extension, it is divided into many subsets that specific models of CPUs can choose to implement.

=== APX ===
The Advanced Performance Extensions (APX) are extensions to double the number of general-purpose registers from 16 to 32 and add new features to improve general-purpose performance. These extensions have been called "generational" and "the biggest x86 addition since 64 bits". Intel contributed APX support to GNU Compiler Collection (GCC) 14. Also Microsoft Visual Studio 2026 added APX support. As of June 2025 the first generation of chips to support APX is slated to be Diamond Rapids.

According to the 2023 architecture specification, the main features of APX are:

- 16 additional general-purpose registers R16-R31, called the Extended GPRs (EGPRs)
- Three-operand instruction formats for many integer instructions
- New conditional instructions for loads, stores, and comparisons with common instructions that do not modify flags
- Optimized register save/restore operations
- A 64-bit absolute direct jump instruction; 32-bit operating systems and 32-bit applications cannot invoke APX

Extended GPRs for general purpose instructions are encoded using a 2-byte REX2 prefix, while new instructions and extended operands for existing AVX/AVX2/AVX-512 instructions are encoded with an extended EVEX prefix which has four variants used for different groups of instructions.

=== x86 Ecosystem Advisory Group ===
In October 2024, the x86 Ecosystem Advisory Group was formed jointly by Intel and AMD. Goals included the enhancement of software consistency and standardizing x86 interfaces and features.

Key technical milestones have included: FRED (Flexible Return and Event Delivery), a modernized interrupt model designed to reduce latency; ChkTag (x86 Memory Tagging) to combat memory safety vulnerabilities; and ACE (Advanced Matrix Extensions for Matrix Multiplication) to standardize capabilities and developer experiences across devices. AVX10 has been further established as the next-generation vector and general-purpose instruction set.

=== x86 Evolution ===
A series of 2025/2026 posts to the LKML and binutils mailing lists has documented various aspects of x86 evolution implemented by an entity other than Intel or AMD that is associated with the EVOLUTIONARY CPUID vendor ID string, making it clear that the x86 ecosystem extends beyond the aforementioned Intel/AMD-only x86 EAG.

The sandpile.org website has captured these changes, annotated with orange colored EVOLVED and EXTINCT tags – in essence they do reflect the expected long-term direction of the x86 ISA, which can be summarized as 64-bit mode (PM64-only) with 5-level paging (PML5-only) and FRED, APX, AVX10, as well as AMX/ACE with support for 16 and 32 tiles (instead of just 8).

== See also ==
- Comparison of instruction set architectures
- x86 calling conventions
- x86 instruction listings
- CPUID
- 680x0, a competing architecture in the 16-bit and early 32-bit eras
- PowerPC, a competing architecture in the later 32-bit and 64-bit eras
- List of AMD processors
- List of Intel processors
- List of Intel CPU microarchitectures
- List of VIA microprocessor cores
- List of x86 manufacturers
- Interrupt request
- Speculative execution CPU vulnerabilities
- Tick–tock model
- Virtual legacy wires
