= Segment descriptor =

Concept in computer architecture

In memory addressing for computer architectures, segment descriptors are a part of the segmentation unit, used for translating a logical address (Note: IBM uses the term logical address in a different, but related, sense than Intel.) to a linear address or to the address of a page table. Segment descriptors describe the memory segment referred to in the logical address.

== Structure ==
The segment descriptor contains the following fields:

1. A segment base address (Note: The base address may refer to physical memory or to a linear address space defined by a page table.) or page table address
2. The segment limit which specifies the segment size
3. Access rights information containing the protection mechanism information
4. Control bits

=== Intel ===
The segment descriptor is 8 bytes long in 80286 and later.

==== The 80286 segment descriptor ====
The 80286 segment descriptor has the following form:

80286 segment descriptor
| bit Off | 7 | 6 | 5 | 4 | 3 | 2 | 1 | 0 | 7 | 6 | 5 | 4 | 3 | 2 | 1 | 0 | Off |
| +7 | Must be zero | | | | | | | | | | | | | | | | +6 |
| +5 | P | DPL | | S = 1 | Type | | | A | Base_{23-16} | | | | | | | | +4 |
| +3 | Base_{15-0} | | | | | | | | | | | | | | | | +2 |
| +1 | Limit_{15-0} | | | | | | | | | | | | | | | | 0 |

==== The x86 and x86-64 segment descriptor ====
The x86 and x86-64 segment descriptor has the following form:

What the fields stand for:

Base Address
Starting memory address of the segment. Its length is 32 bits and it is created from the lower part bits 16 to 31, and the upper part bits 0 to 7, followed by bits 24 to 31.
Segment Limit
Its length is 20 bits and is created from the lower part bits 0 to 15 and the upper part bits 16 to 19. It defines the address of the last accessible data. The length is one more than the value stored here. How exactly this should be interpreted depends on the Granularity bit of the segment descriptor.
G=Granularity
If clear, the limit is in units of bytes, with a maximum of 2^{20} bytes. If set, the limit is in units of 4096-byte pages, for a maximum of 2^{32} bytes.
D/B
D = Default operand size : If clear, this is a 16-bit code segment; if set, this is a 32-bit segment.
B = Big: If set, the maximum offset size for a data segment is increased to 32-bit 0xffffffff. Otherwise it's the 16-bit max 0x0000ffff. Essentially the same meaning as "D".
L=Long
If set, this is a 64-bit segment (and D must be zero), and code in this segment uses the 64-bit instruction encoding. "L" cannot be set at the same time as "D" aka "B". (Bit 21 in the image)
AVL=Available
For software use, not used by hardware (Bit 20 in the image with the label A)
P=Present
If clear, a "segment not present" exception is generated on any reference to this segment
DPL=Descriptor privilege level
Privilege level (ring) required to access this descriptor
S=System Segment
If clear, this is system segment, used to handle interrupts or store LDT segment descriptors. If 1, this is Code/Data segment.
Type
If set, this is a code segment descriptor. If clear, this is a data/stack segment descriptor, which has "D" replaced by "B", "C" replaced by "E"and "R" replaced by "W". This is in fact a special case of the 2-bit type field, where the preceding bit 12 cleared as "0" refers to more internal system descriptors, for LDT, LSS, and gates.
C=Conforming
Code in this segment may be called from less-privileged levels.
E=Expand-Down
If clear, the segment expands from base address up to base+limit. If set, it expands from maximum offset down to limit, a behavior usually used for stacks.
R=Readable
If clear, the segment may be executed but not read from.
W=Writable
If clear, the data segment may be read but not written to.
A=Accessed
This bit is set to 1 by hardware when the segment is accessed, and cleared by software.

=== IBM S/370 and successors ===
The S/370, S/370-XA, ESA/370 and ESA/390 segment table entries (STEs) are one word long. All processors running in S/370 mode used the same format, but not all supported the common-segment facility and the protected segment facility. XA introduced a new format and replaced segment protection with page protection.

With z/Architecture the STE is a doubleword.

==== The S/370 segment-table entry ====
The segment-table entry for the S/370 has the following form

S/370 Segment-Table Entry
| 0 | 3 | 4 | 7 | 8 | 28 | 29 | 30 | 31 |
| TBL | | 0000 | | Page-Table Origin | | P | C | I |

Page-Table Origin
Left 21 bits of Page Table Origin (PTO), has 3 zero bits appended
TBL
Table length in units that are 1/16 of the maximum (Note: Depends on the translation Format (bits 8-12) in Control Register 0.) allowed size, offset by one unit.
P
Segment-Protection Bit
C
Common-Segment Bit
I
Segment-Invalid Bit

==== The S/370-XA through S/390 segment-table entry ====
The segment-table entry for the S/370-XA, ESA/370 and ESA/390 has the following form

S/370-XA through ESA/390 Segment-Table Entry
| 0 | 1 | 25 | 26 | 27 | 28 | 31 |
|---|---|---|---|---|---|---|
| 0 | Page-Table Origin | | I | C | TBL | |

Page-Table Origin
Left 25 bits of PTO, has 6 zero bits appended
I
Invalid
C
Common-Segment Bit
TBL
Table length in 64-byte units, offset by one unit

==== The z/Architecture segment-table entry ====
In the original z/Architecture, a segment is always subject to paging and the Segment-Table Entry always points to a page table. However, on a model equipped with the Enhanced-DAT Facility 1, the Enhanced-DAT-enablement control (bit 40) o

The segment-table entry for the z/Architecture has the following forms

z/Architecture Segment-Table Entry (TT=00, FC=0)
| 0 | | | | | | | | | | 31 |
|---|---|---|---|---|---|---|---|---|---|---|
Page-Table Origin
| 32 | 53 | 54 | 55 | 57 | 58 | 59 | 60 | 61 | 62 | 63 |
| Page-Table Origin (continued) | F C | P | | | I | C S | TT | | | |

Page-Table Origin
Left 53 bits of PTO, has 11 zero bits appended
FC=0
Format Control - paged segment
P
DAT-protection (fetch protect)
I
Segment-Invalid Bit
CS
Common-Segment Bit
TT=00
Table Type Segment

z/Architecture Segment-Table Entry (TT=00, FC=1, EDAT-1)
| 0 | | | | | | | | | | | | | | | | | | 31 |
|---|---|---|---|---|---|---|---|---|---|---|---|---|---|---|---|---|---|---|
Segment-Frame Absolute Address
| 32 | 43 | 44 | 46 | 47 | 48 | 51 | 52 | 53 | 54 | 55 | 56 | 57 | 58 | 59 | 60 | 61 | 62 | 63 |
| Segment-Frame Absolute Address (continued) | | | | A V | ACC | | F | F C | P | I E P | | | I | C S | TT | | | |

ACCF-Validity Control (AV)
Use ACC to check key
ACC
Access control key
F
Fetch protection when AV=1
FC=1
Format Control - points to absolute address
P
DAT-protection (fetch protect)
Instruction-Execution-Protection (IEP) Control
Instruction execution prohibited
I
Segment-Invalid Bit
CS
Common-Segment Bit
TT=00
Table Type Segment

== See also ==
- Burroughs large systems descriptors
- Memory segment
- Memory address
