= PerfectDisk =

- Developer: Raxco
- Stable release: PerfectDisk 14 Build 900 / 12 October 2021; 4 years ago
- Operating system: Windows XP and later
- Website: www.raxco.com/home/products/perfectdisk-pro

PerfectDisk is a defragmentation software product for Windows developed by Raxco.

The application keeps track of file usage to lessen defragmentation time and offers two modes of basic defragging: "quick" and "SmartPlacement". SmartPlacement was Raxco's proprietary toolkit for more accurate, albeit slower defragging, and was marketed as a main selling point over the built-in tool of Windows' built in defragmentation tools.

== History ==
During the 1980s, a software package titled "Disk-Optimizer" was marketed as part of the collective name "RAXCO Rabbit Software."

PerfectDisk was released in 1990 for the VMS operating system. A version for Windows NT followed later in 1997. PerfectDisk contains scheduler supporting also client PCs in the network.

The last version of PerfectDisk is 14.00 build 900. As Raxco filled for bankruptcy in April, 2024, PerfectDisk users can still use the installed software, but no activations will be done after May, 2024, and no support will be provided past this date.

== Competition ==
The standard Windows "Disk Defragmenter" is based on a subset of a competing, now-discontinued product named Diskeeper. For those seeking additional features, PerfectDisk and the full-feature Diskeeper are among their options; these are intended for high-end users, and feature optimizing the placement of "system files and free space."

== See also ==
- File system fragmentation
- Defragmentation
- Disk Defragmenter (Windows)
- List of defragmentation software
- Comparison of defragmentation software
