= JkDefrag =

Computer program

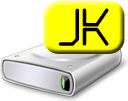

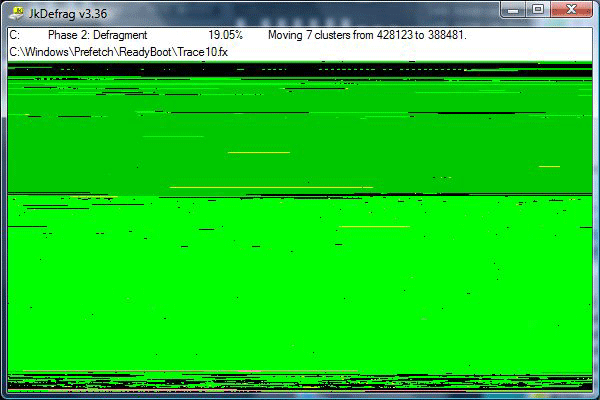
- Image of drive during defrag.
- Original author: Jeroen Kessels
- Final release: 3.36.0.2 / August 31, 2008; 17 years ago
- Written in: Microsoft Visual C++ 2005
- Operating system: Windows 2000; Windows Server 2003; Windows XP; Windows XP x64 Edition; Windows Vista
- Type: Defragmentation program
- License: GNU GPL
- Website: www.kessels.com/JkDefrag/

JkDefrag is a free open-source disk defragmenting utility computer program for Windows. It was developed by Jeroen Kessels (initials "JK", hence the name) beginning in 2004 and was released under the GNU General Public License. Since version 4 of 2008, much changed from previous versions, JkDefrag was renamed MyDefrag by its developer; earlier JkDefrag versions continued to be available. MyDefrag, which was closed source freeware, was discontinued, with the last version being v4.3.1, file date 21 May 2010; for several years the MyDefrag website has been a redirect to the still-existing JkDefrag site, but links to downloadable JKdefrag files are dead. As of 2026 JkDefrag 3.36 source code remained available from third-party websites

== Operation ==
JkDefrag has many options. If run without options it groups files into 3 zones with the intention of optimizing speed:

1. Directories and system files
2. Regular files
3. Large files referred to as "space hogs" in the documentation

Files outside their zone are moved to their zone. Directories are perhaps the most accessed data on disk, so zone 1 is placed at the beginning of the drive. After the directories comes a free space area, then zone 2 with regular files, another free area, and then zone 3 with "space hogs", which are large files, archives, Recycle Bin contents, service pack files, and other infrequently accessed data.

JkDefrag characteristics:

- Both command-line & graphical executable programs, about 500 kilobytes total size;
- Automated operation;
- A range of command line interface options, allowing for scheduled defragmentation with administrator scripts;
- No need for installation; runs with default options by opening JkDefrag.exe;
- Screensaver defragmentation, with the option to run another screensaver when done;
- Source code (Microsoft Visual C++ 2005 for 32-bit version and Microsoft Visual C++ 2008 for 64-bit version) available;
- A DLL library (for use in programming) licensed using the LGPL;
- Support for 64-bit versions of Windows XP and Vista with native x64 binaries;
- Documentation available on the web site.

JkDefrag uses the Windows defragmentation API.

== Related software ==
There are several graphical user interface utilities designed to work with JkDefrag:

- JKDefrag Option GUI by Emiel Wieldraaijer includes support for 26 languages, and has support for BartPE and U3 implementations. It was also nominated "Repair Tool of the Week" in TechNibble in August 2007.
- JkDefragGUI by Markus Hörl is portable, includes support for 10(+30) languages, and there is a setup version.
- ScanDefrag supports JkDefrag and allows it to run during Windows startup.

Another Windows-based defrag program with a GNU GPL is UltraDefrag before version 8.

== See also ==
- File system fragmentation
- List of defragmentation software
