= Vopt =

Windows defragmentation utility

- Developer: Golden Bow Systems
- Stable release: 9.21.0001 (November 14, 2010) [±]
- Operating system: Windows
- Type: Defragmentation
- License: Proprietary
- Website: vopt.com dead link

Vopt (pronounced "vopt") is a Windows defragmentation utility sold by Golden Bow Systems. It is one of the oldest defragmentation products, and has supported MS-DOS and all versions of Microsoft Windows. The convenience of quick processing time is offset by less optimal performance, but when used in conjunction with the built-in optimization of the Windows prefetch folder, system performance is maintained without major reorganization of all the files on the drive.

In February 2016, the registration key is released free in accordance with the author Barry Emerson's wish.

== Features ==
The aim of any defragger is to reduce or eliminate file fragmentation, and thereby improve the performance of the file system. Vopt achieves this by means of the following features:

- Fast defragmentation algorithm when compared to the Windows Defragmenter
- Optionally cleans up cookies, internet cache, temporary files and recycle bin before defrag. This saves time and allows for more efficient file placement.
- Information display shows largest, fragmented, and locked files, to assist in problem solving
- Can be run at startup, so that recently fragmented files are processed in a few minutes, keeping the system well organized.

This combination of features is not shared by other defrag programs, and Vopt fills a niche in the defragger market not addressed by its competitors. As such it has earned the recommendation and endorsement of reviewers and industry analysts alike. In "Computing At Chaos Manor", Jerry Pournelle writes:

I differ from some of the pundits over disk defragmentation. I think it helps, particularly on laptops where you aren’t likely to have a lot of extra disk space. The defragmenter I recommend is VOPT from Golden Bow, but anyone who has been reading this column for long knows that. I have been using VOPT for two decades, and I have never lost a byte of data from doing it. The first time you run VOPT it can take a long time. After that it's faster. I am sure there are faster defragmenters, but I am even more sure there is no safer defragmenter.

I am not entirely fond of the [Vopt8] interface, but the program has new capabilities. Disk defragmentation isn't as important in these days of enormous disks as it used to be, but it's still worth doing: among other advantages, programs that have been defragmented load faster, and there's less wear on the disk drive. Drives run cooler, and that may be important in hot weather. I use VOPT regularly even when my disks are not full. Highly recommended.

Version 7 is the only commercially available defrag program still supporting 16-bit Windows. Users upgrading from Windows 95 to Windows XP have been able to retain the use of their existing package. Version 8 works with NTFS-compatible versions of Windows, using the built-in File defrag API. Version 3.0 supports NT.

Windows gives you two tools for maintaining your hard drive and helping its performance. ... Check Disk and Defrag aren't the best tools available for maintaining your hard drive. You can find better versions of these tools in third-party utilities ... another good alternative for the Defrag tool is Vopt ("Vee-Opt") from Golden Bow Systems.

== Compatibility ==
Vopt (version 9.12 and later) is fully compatible with 64-bit versions of Windows, including 64-bit Windows 7.

== See also ==
- Comparison of defragmentation software
- File system fragmentation
- List of defragmentation software
