= O&O Defrag =

- O&O Defrag 14 Professional Edition running under Windows 7
- Developers: O&O Software
- Stable release: 30.5.1211 / December 12, 2025
- Operating system: Windows NT 4.0 to Windows 11
- Type: Defragmentation
- License: Shareware
- Website: oo-software.com

O&O Defrag is a Windows defragmentation utility sold by German software developer O&O Software. It has won several awards by PC journals and magazines for all its current NTFS-based operating systems, including NT 4.0, 2000, XP, Vista, 7, 8, 8.1, 10, 11, Server 2003, 2008, 2008 R2, 2012, 2012 R2, 2016, 2019, 2022 and 2025.

== Features ==
- When required, the program checks the volume for errors before defragmenting.
- The defrag procedure can be scheduled for a certain time, or can be carried out when the PC is normally idle.
- The defrag can be run in the background so that the user hardly notices its operation.
- The defrag can be run in screensaver mode.
- Zone filing: categorize different files into different zones according to their levels of use and apply different methods to files in respective zones (a feature introduced in version 12).

There are five different defrag methods: Stealth, Space, Complete/Name, Complete/Modified, Complete/Access. "Stealth" is designed for use on PCs with large files and little free space, while the "Space" method is designed for heavily fragmented drives. The three "Complete" methods (Name, Modified and Access) sort the files on your drives alphabetically, according to date last changed, and according to date last accessed.

Simple defragmentation as on a hard drive is unnecessary and significantly wears the cells of a solid-state drive (SSD). O&O Defrag claims to defragment using the SSD TRIM command in a way that both increases access speed and reduces wear, extending the life of an SSD.

== Reviews ==
O&O Defrag was reviewed by CHIP magazine in 2025.

== See also ==
- Comparison of defragmentation software
- File system fragmentation
- List of defragmentation software
- Official archive download from O&O website
