= UltimateDefrag =

- Developer: Disktrix Inc.
- Stable release: 6.1.2.0 / 28 July 2021; 4 years ago
- Operating system: Windows XP and later
- Website: disktrix.com

UltimateDefrag is a retail file-system defragmentation utility made by DiskTrix. An older version of the program is available as the UltimateDefrag Freeware Edition.

== Overview ==
Information regarding files is displayed in a circular graph representing the physical disk, indicating sections that are fragmented, compressed, reserved for system use, along with other information. From this, the user can select sections of the disk, see a list of the files in that section showing information regarding individual file fragmentation and location, and individually defragment files or drag and drop them to the desired section on the disk.

Along with defragmentation, UltimateDefrag performs consolidation of both disk space and files within folders, arrangement of files by volatility (most often used files) or recency (most recently used files), and analysis of the disk. In addition, UltimateDefrag has the ability to defragment files based on manually entered wildcard expressions.

The software comes with boot level defragmentation, allowing user-controlled relocation and placement of normally unmovable files, such as the page file. This reduces disk head movement resulting from a page file that is fragmented or located on the hard drive far from other frequently used files. However, the program recommends, an indispensable action, that the user make a backup (which should be a full partition backup, not just data backup) of any drive on which boot level defragmentation is attempted. If the program fails during boot level relocation of critical files such as $MFT, portions of the file structure may be damaged and the computer might no longer boot properly to the desktop screen.

== See also ==
- List of defragmentation software
- Comparison of defragmentation software
