= Defrag (disambiguation) =

Defrag may refer to:

- Defragmentation, in the context of maintaining computer file systems, is a process that reduces the number of pieces of a file and/or the scattered available areas.
- DEFRAG, DOS and Windows 9x-systems FAT defragmentation utility
- DeFRaG, unofficial Quake III Arena video game modification

== See also ==
- List of defragmentation software
- Comparison of defragmentation software
