= Microsoft Drive Optimizer =

Windows utility which defragments a hard drive

- Microsoft Drive Optimizer in Windows 10
- Other names: Disk Defragmenter (Windows 95–7)
- Developer: Microsoft
- Operating system: Microsoft Windows
- Type: Defragmentation software
- License: Proprietary commercial software

Microsoft Drive Optimizer (formerly Disk Defragmenter) is a utility in Microsoft Windows designed to increase data access speed by rearranging files stored on a disk to occupy contiguous storage locations, a technique called defragmentation.

Defragmenting a disk minimizes head travel, which reduces the time it takes to read files from and write files to the disk. As a result of the decreased read and write times, Microsoft Disk Defragmenter decreases system startup times for systems starting from magnetic storage devices such as a hard disk drive (HDD). Defragmentation however is unnecessary and harmful to storage devices that use flash memory like SD cards or solid-state drives (SSDs), as these do not use a head. Doing so may decrease lifespan for these types of devices.

In Windows 8 and later it was renamed Defragment and Optimize Drives; SSDs were optimised in a useful and appropriate way by performing TRIM operation instead.

== Early history ==
As early as the end of 1982, the IBM PC DOS operating system that shipped with early IBM Personal Computers included a Disk Volume Organization Optimizer to defragment the 5¼-inch floppy disks that those machines used. At this time, Microsoft's MS-DOS did not defragment hard disks. Several third party software developers marketed defragmenters to fill this gap. MS-DOS 6.0 introduced Microsoft Defrag, being a licensed, cut-down version of Norton SpeedDisk. Windows NT, however, did not offer a Defrag utility, and Symantec was suggested by others as a possible alternative for the utility.

Initial releases of Windows NT lacked a defragmentation tool. Versions through Windows NT 3.51 did not have an application programming interface for moving data clusters on hard disks. Executive Software, later renamed Diskeeper Corporation, released Diskeeper defragmentation software for Windows NT 3.51, which shipped with a customized version of the NT kernel and file system drivers that could move clusters.

Microsoft included file system control (FSCTL) commands to move clusters in the Windows NT 4.0 kernel, which worked for both NTFS and FAT partitions. However, Windows NT 4.0 did not provide a graphical or command-line user interface.

== Debut and early versions ==
Disk Defragmenter first shipped as part of Windows 95 and later shipped with Windows 98 and Windows Me, licensed from Symantec Corporation. It could be scheduled using a Maintenance Wizard and supported command line switches. In the version of Disk Defragmenter included with Windows 95 and 98, if the contents of the drive changed during defragmentation, the program paused, rescanned the entire drive, and then resumed the process from where it had left off. This quirk was removed in the Windows Me version of Disk Defragmenter.

Disk Defragmenter in Windows 2000 was a stripped-down version of Diskeeper, licensed from Diskeeper Corporation. Being an improved version of the program previously available for Windows NT 3.51, it uses the following techniques:

1. Moving all the index or directory information to one spot. Moving this spot into the center of the data, i.e. one third of the way in, so that average head travel to data is halved compared to having directory information at the front.
2. Moving infrequently used files further from the directory area.
3. Obeying a user-provided table of file descriptions to emphasize or ignore.
4. Making files contiguous so that they can be read without unnecessary seeking.

In Windows 2000 and later operating systems, Microsoft Disk Defragementer has the following limitations:

- It does not defragment files residing in the Recycle Bin or files that are in use. In particular, this includes the registry, page file and hibernation file.
- Prior to the Windows Vista release, only one volume could be analyzed or defragmented at a time and only one instance could run.
- Only local volumes can be defragmented; network volumes are not supported.
- The GUI version prior to Windows Vista cannot be scheduled. However, the command line utility since Windows XP and later can be scheduled.
- Unlike previous versions, the GUI version in Windows Vista does not display a map of disk fragmentation, nor does it display progress during defragmentation.

In addition, the Windows 2000 version has the following limitations which were removed in Windows XP:

- Defragmenting NTFS volumes with cluster sizes larger than 4 kilobytes (KB) is not possible.
- It is not possible to perform fine-grained movement of uncompressed NTFS file data in Windows 2000. Moving a single file cluster also moves the 4 KB part of the file that contains the cluster.
- EFS encrypted files are not defragmented.

== Windows XP and Server 2003 ==
Windows Disk Defragmenter was updated to alleviate some restrictions. It no longer relies on the Windows NT Cache Manager, which prevented the defragmenter from moving pieces of a file that cross a 256KB boundary within the file. NTFS metadata files can also be defragmented. A command-line tool, defrag.exe, has been included, providing access to the defragmenter from cmd.exe and Task Scheduler. Windows XP and later has introduced Boot Files Defragment function, this function is enabled by default and can be disabled in Registry.

== Windows Vista and Server 2008 ==
In Windows Vista and later, if the Master File Table (MFT) is spread into multiple fragments, the defrag engine can combine the MFT fragments during defragmentation.

In Windows Vista, Disk Defragmenter includes an option to automatically run at scheduled times using Task Scheduler and uses low CPU priority and the newly introduced low priority I/O algorithm so that it can continue to defrag using reduced resources (less CPU and disk read/write activity) when the computer is in use. The user interface has been simplified, with the color graph, progress indicator, disk analysis and fragmentation information being removed entirely.

If the fragments of a file are over 64 MB in size, the file is not defragmented if using the GUI; Microsoft has stated that this is because there is no discernible performance benefit since the time seeking such large chunks of data is negligible compared to the time required to read them. The result, however, is that Disk Defragmenter does not require a certain amount of free space in order to successfully defrag a volume, unlike performing a full defragmentation which requires at least 15% of free space on the volume. The command line utility, Defrag.exe, offers more control over the defragmentation process, such as performing a full defragmentation by consolidating all file fragments regardless of size. This utility can be used to defragment specific volumes or to just analyze volumes as the defragmenter would in Windows XP.

Disk Defragmenter is maintained by Microsoft's Core File Services. The Windows Vista version has been updated in Windows Vista SP1 to include the improvements made in Windows Server 2008. The most notable of these improvements is that the ability to select which volumes are to be defragmented has been added back. Notably, the Windows Vista defragmenter is much more effective than the version included with XP.

== Windows 7 and later ==
Windows 7 reintroduces the analyze function and showing percent complete of the defragmentation, both of which were removed in Windows Vista. It can also defragment multiple volumes simultaneously.

According to Scott Hanselman of Microsoft, Windows 7 and later do optimize a solid-state disk (SSD) but in a completely different way. Because SSDs work in a different way than Hard Disk Drives, there is no performance benefit from defragmentation of files on SSDs. Additionally, SSDs handle a finite number of storage write cycles before their lifespan expires. However, file systems cannot support infinite file fragmentation as they reach their metadata limit. Microsoft Drive Optimizer (formerly Disk Defragmenter) in Windows 7 and later is aware of whether the disk in use is an HDD or an SSD. For HDDs, full defragmentation is supported including file defragmentation. For SSDs, it only performs defragmentation of file system metadata if volume snapshots are enabled for that disk. This is done to maintain optimal volume snapshot copy on write performance on fragmented SSD volumes. In Windows 8 and later, it is also responsible for performing a manual TRIM or retrim operation on SSDs.

== See also ==
- Defragmentation
- File system fragmentation
- Comparison of defragmentation software
