= Resident set size =

Memory occupied by a program and its data

In computing, resident set size (RSS) is the portion of memory (measured in kilobytes) occupied by a process that is held in main memory (RAM). The rest of the occupied memory exists in the swap space or file system, either because some parts of the occupied memory were paged out, or because some parts of the executable were never loaded.

== See also ==
- Proportional set size (PSS)
- Unique set size (USS) – Unshared portion of main memory occupied by a process
- Demand paging – Method of virtual memory management
- Virtual memory – Computer memory management technique
- Working set – Set of resources actively used by a process
- Working set size – Amount of memory needed to compute the answer to a problem
