= UltraDefrag =

Disk defragmentation utility for Windows

- Original authors: Dmitri Arkhangelski, Stefan Pendl, Justin Dearing, Sayem Chaklader
- Developers: Green Gate Systems, LLC
- Initial release: July 5, 2007; 18 years ago
- Stable release: 15.0.0 (January 24, 2026; 0 days ago) [±]
- Repository: sourceforge.net/projects/ultradefrag/ (Only open source code release of UltraDefrag)
- Written in: C, C++, Lua, JavaScript
- Operating system: Windows 11; Windows 10; Windows 8.1; Windows 8 Windows 7 Windows Vista; Windows XP; Windows 2000; Windows NT 4.0
- Platform: IA-32, x64, IA-64
- Type: Defragmentation software
- License: Proprietary for 8.0.0+, GNU GPL for 7.1.x and under
- Website: ultradefrag.net

UltraDefrag is a disk defragmentation utility for Microsoft Windows. Prior to version 8.0.0 it was released under the GNU General Public License.

In 2018, UltraDefrag sources have been relicensed to Green Gate Systems. Their enhanced version, released under a proprietary license, features placement of selected files to the fastest disk sectors, disk health monitoring and protection, automatic defragmentation, disk cleanup before defragmentation, graphical interface for setting user preferences, optimization of solid state drives, full compatibility with Windows 11 and 10, and is said to have much faster disk processing algorithms.

UltraDefrag uses the defragmentation part of Windows API and works on Windows NT 4.0 and later. It supports FAT12, FAT16, FAT32, exFAT, and NTFS file systems.

Jean-Pierre André, one of the developers of NTFS-3G, has created a fork of UltraDefrag 5 that runs on Linux. It only has a command-line interface.

== Features ==
- Placement of selected files to the fastest disk sectors
- Disk health monitoring and protection
- Automatic defragmentation
- Windows updates cleanup before defragmentation
- Automatic temporary files cleanup before defragmentation
- Defragmentation of individual files and folders
- Defragmentation of locked system files
- Defragmentation of NTFS metafiles (including MFT) and streams
- Exclusion of files by path, size and number of fragments
- Optimization of disks
- Disk processing time limit
- Defragmentation of disks having a certain fragmentation level
- Automatic hibernation or shutdown after the job completion
- Multilingual graphical interface (over 60 languages available)
- One click defragmentation via Windows Explorer's context menu
- Command line interface
- Portable edition
- Full support of 64-bit editions of Windows

== See also ==
- Comparison of defragmentation software
- File system fragmentation
