= Defraggler =

Defragmentation utility for Windows

- Defraggler defragmenting in Windows 8
- Developer: Piriform Software
- Release: 18 August 2008; 18 years ago
- Stable release: 2.22.995 (May 2, 2018) [±]
- Operating system: Windows 10, 8.1, 7, Vista and XP. Including both 32-bit and 64-bit versions, but not RT tablet editions.
- Platform: IA-32 and x64
- Size: 4.3 MB
- Available in: 37 languages
- List of languages English, Albanian, Arabic, Armenian, Bosnian, Brazilian Portuguese (Portugues do Brasil), Bulgarian, Catalan (Catala), Chinese (Simplified), Chinese (Traditional), Croatian, Czech (Ceský), Danish, Dutch (Nederlands), Estonian, Finnish (Suomi), French (Français), Georgian, German (Deutsch), Greek, Hebrew, Hungarian (Magyar), Italian (Italiano), Japanese, Lithuanian (Lietuviu), Norwegian, Persian, Polish (Polski), Portuguese (Portugues), Romanian (Romana), Russian, Slovak, Spanish (Español), Swedish (Svenska), Turkish (Türkçe), Ukrainian, Vietnamese
- Type: Defragmentation software
- License: Freemium
- Website: www.ccleaner.com/defraggler

Defraggler is a formerly-supported freeware defragmentation utility developed by Piriform Software, which can defragment individual files or groups of files on computer memory systems. Defraggler runs on Microsoft Windows; it has support for all versions since Windows XP. It includes support for both IA-32 and x64 versions of these operating systems. In September 2026, Piriform announced that Defraggler had reached its end of life. It is no longer hosted on Piriform's website, and all download and support pages for the product have been removed.

== Overview ==
Defraggler can defragment individual files, groups of files (in a folder) or an entire disk partition, either by the user's command or automatically on a schedule. It supports FAT32, NTFS, and exFAT. It can also be installed as a portable application on a USB flash drive. Defragmentation of RAID disks is also supported, although no details are supplied.

Defraggler was given a 5/5 star rating from Softpedia. In Lifehacker's Hive Five for Best Disk Defragmenter, Defraggler received first place.

== See also ==
- CCleaner
- Recuva
- Comparison of defragmentation software
