= PageDefrag =

- Original author: Mark Russinovich
- Developer: Microsoft (formerly Sysinternals)
- Stable release: 2.32 / November 1, 2006; 19 years ago
- Operating system: Windows
- Type: Defragmentation
- License: Proprietary Freeware
- Website: Windows Sysinternals

PageDefrag is a program, developed by Sysinternals (now distributed by Microsoft), for Microsoft Windows that runs at start-up to defragment the virtual memory page file, the registry files and the Event Viewer's logs (files such as AppEvent.Evt, SysEvent.Evt, SecEvent.Evt and so on).

== Overview ==
Using PageDefrag may improve performance. Since PageDefrag only affects a few files, it takes a relatively short time to run when compared to entire-disk defragmenters such as Windows Defrag, so long as the page file is not fragmented. If the page file is fragmented, PageDefrag can take as long or longer than Windows Defrag. However, a defragmentation of the page file can improve performance much more than defragmentation of the Registry will.

PageDefrag does not defragment the contents of the registry files, only the placement of these files on the hard drive. Other utilities such as NTREGOPT can optimize the registry files.

PageDefrag runs on Windows NT 4.0, Windows 2000, Windows XP, and Windows Server 2003. Though the website erroneously says "runs on Windows XP (32-bit) and higher (32-bit), Windows Server 2003 (32-bit) and higher (32-bit)", the tool cannot defragment the pagefile on Windows Vista, Windows 7, or Server 2008; it is able to defragment registry hives on these versions. Workarounds for higher versions of Windows, including 64-bit versions, include using a BartPE disk or booting from a Windows install CD and using the provided command line interface.

== See also ==
- Defragmentation
- List of defragmentation software
