= Comparison of defragmentation software =

The following is a comparison of notable file system defragmentation software:

Program	Developer	License	Supported file systems	Supported platforms	GUI	CLI	Script	Scheduler	Boot time	Auto defrag when idle	Stable release
Auslogics Disk Defrag	Auslogics	Freeware	FAT16, FAT32, NTFS	Windows XP and later	Yes	Yes		Yes	Yes	Yes	10.2.0.1 (Free), 4.11.0.7 (Ultimate) (January 26, 2022 (Free), March 3, 2020 (Ultimate)) [±]
AVG PC TuneUp	AVG Technologies	Trialware									2015 (v15.0.1001.238) (November 30, 2014)
Contig	Microsoft	Freeware	NTFS	Windows XP and later; Windows Server 2003 and later	No	Yes	No	Yes, with Windows Task Scheduler	No	Yes, with Windows Task Scheduler (Note: Windows Task Scheduler "Idle" schedules and options settings will be applied to scheduled tasks.)	1.8 (July 4, 2016)
Defraggler	Piriform	Freeware	FAT32, NTFS, exFAT, ReFS	Windows XP and later	Yes	Yes	No	Yes, with Windows Task Scheduler (Note: Defraggler's GUI only provides an interface to configure defragmenting activity in Windows Task Scheduler.)	Yes	Yes, with Windows Task Scheduler	2.22.995 (May 2, 2018) [±]
Drive Optimizer (formerly Disk Defragmenter)	Microsoft	Bundled with Microsoft Windows	FAT16, FAT32, NTFS, ReFS	Windows 2000 and later; Windows 95 and later	Yes	Yes	Yes	Yes, with Windows Task Scheduler	No	No	Same as Windows
Diskeeper	Condusiv Technologies	Discontinued (formerly trialware	FAT16, FAT32, NTFS	Windows XP and later	Yes	Yes	Yes	Yes (Note: Condusiv Technologies claims its InvisiTasking technology eliminates the need for scheduled defragmentation.)	Yes	Yes	2020 (20.0.1302) (March 23, 2020) [±]
JkDefrag	Jeroen Kessels	GNU GPL	FAT & NTFS	Windows 2000, Windows XP, Windows Vista	Yes	Yes					3.36.0.2 / August 31, 2008
O&O Defrag	O&O Software	Trialware	FAT16, FAT32, NTFS, exFAT, ReFS	Windows NT 4.0, 2000, XP, Vista, 7, 8.x, 10, 11. Server 2003, 2008, 2012, 2016, 2019, 2022	Yes	Yes	Yes	Yes	Yes	Yes	27.0.8038 (September 12, 2023) [±]
PageDefrag	Microsoft	Freeware	FAT16, FAT32, NTFS	Windows 2000, XP	No	No	No	No	Yes	No	
PerfectDisk	Raxco	Discontinued (formerly trialware	FAT16, FAT32, exFAT, NTFS, ReFS* and CSVFS	Windows XP SP3 or higher (x86, x64), Windows 10, Windows Server 2003 SP1, Windows Server 2019	Yes	Enterprise Console edition only		Yes	Yes	Yes	PerfectDisk 14 Build 900 (2021)
UltimateDefrag	DiskTrix	Trialware	FAT32, NTFS	Windows XP and later	Yes	Yes		Yes	Yes		6.1.2.0 (28 July 2021)
UltraDefrag	Dmitri Arkhangelski, Justin Dearing, Sayem Chaklader, Stefan Pendl	Commercial software (8.0+) / GNU GPL (7.1.x)	FAT12, FAT16, FAT32, NTFS, exFAT, ReFS	Windows NT 4.0 and later	Yes	Yes	Yes (Note: UltraDefrag can be run in batch scripts and apply several parameters separately for each disk.)	Yes, with Windows Task Scheduler	Yes	Yes, with Windows Task Scheduler	15.0.0 (January 24, 2026; 2 months ago) [±], Open source version discontinued
Vopt	GoldenBow (or DataTuna)	Discontinued (formerly freeware)	FAT32, NTFS	Windows 2000 and later	Yes			Yes			9.21.0001 (November 14, 2010) [±]
Program	Developer	License	Supported file systems	Supported platforms	GUI	CLI	Script	Scheduler	Boot time	Auto defrag when idle	Stable release
