= Unique set size =

Unshared portion of main memory occupied by a process

In computing, unique set size (USS) is the portion of main memory (RAM) occupied by a process which is guaranteed to be private to that process. The unshared memory of a process is reported as USS.

This concept is used for software running under the Linux operating system. It was proposed by Matt Mackall because of the complications that arose when trying to count the "real memory" used by a process. The concepts of resident set size or virtual memory size (VmSize) weren't helping developers who tried to know how much memory their programs were using.

== See also ==
- Proportional set size
- Resident set size
