= Proportional set size =

In computing, proportional set size (PSS) is the portion of main memory (RAM) occupied by a process and is composed by the private memory of that process plus the proportion of shared memory with one or more other processes. Unshared memory including the proportion of shared memory is reported as the PSS.

Example:

- Process A has 50 KiB of unshared memory
- Process B has 300 KiB of unshared memory
- Both process A and process B have 100 KiB of the same shared memory region

Since the PSS is defined as the sum of the unshared memory of a process and the proportion of memory shared with other processes, the PSS for these two processes are as follows:

- PSS of process A = 50 KiB + (100 KiB / 2) = 100 KiB
- PSS of process B = 300 KiB + (100 KiB / 2) = 350 KiB

This concept is mostly related (if not unique) to the Linux operating system. It was proposed by Matt Mackall because of the complications that arose when trying to count the "real memory" used by a process. The concepts of resident set size or virtual memory size (VmSize) weren't helping developers who tried to know how much memory their programs were using.

== See also ==
- Unique set size
- Resident set size
