= Condusiv Technologies =

American software company

- Type: Privately held company
- Industry: Computer software
- Founded: Glendale, California, United States (March 1, 1981)
- Founder: Craig Jensen
- Headquarters: 7590 N. Glenoaks Blvd, Burbank, California, United States
- Area served: Worldwide
- Products: Diskeeper; V-locity; Undelete; HyperFast; HyperBoot; InvisiTasking; IntelliWrite; ExpressCache; I-FAAST
- Website: www.condusiv.com

Condusiv Technologies is an American software company based in Burbank, California. The company was formerly known as Diskeeper Corporation, a name derived from its flagship product, Diskeeper, a file-system defragmentation software package for Microsoft Windows and OpenVMS. Before adopting the Diskeeper name, the company was known as Executive Software International, Inc.

== History ==
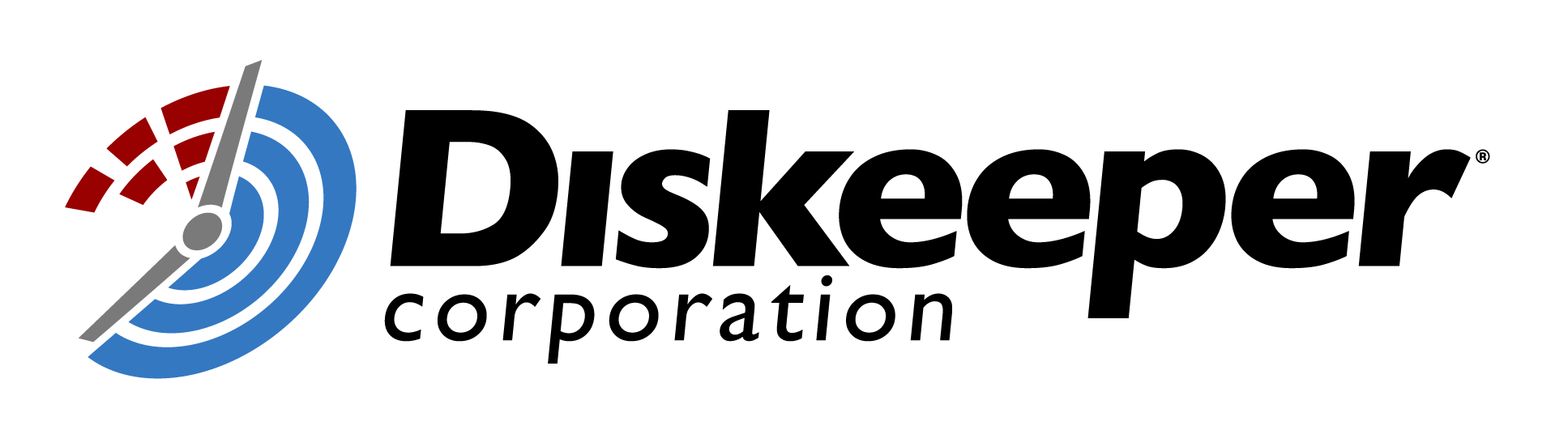
Old logo

It was founded in March, 1981, by Craig Jensen. The company was initially created to serve VAX/VMS platforms. Because the product allowed companies to defragment without shutting their systems down, its original customer base was Fortune 500 and Fortune 1000 companies, government agencies, air traffic control, NASA and others with mission critical systems or systems that needed to be running 24/7.

In the early 1990s, Diskeeper was the best-selling third-party software product for Digital Equipment Corporation business computers. The company, then named Executive Software, placed on Software magazine's list of the Top 100 Independent Software Companies for four years in a row (1989-1992).

In 1995 the company was asked by Microsoft to develop products for its Windows NT system before it was released. One of Microsoft's original source code licensees, the company broke into the Windows market with the resulting defrag product for Windows NT.

Jerry Baldwin was appointed CEO in September 2011 and Craig Jensen passed his managerial and day-to-day involvement with the company on to Baldwin. Baldwin renamed the company to Condusiv Technologies and completely restructured and re-focused the company on Cloud, Virtualization and Optimization. The tagline "Think Faster" is now the company motto.

=== Founder ===
While studying electrical engineering at Northwestern University in 1968, Craig Jensen took a night job as a computer operator to learn about computers. He went on to develop advanced operating systems for early technology pioneer Applied Data Research, and in 1974 moved to Data General Corporation. He founded Executive Software International in 1981, he says, "with an early personal computer and a box of file folders in his kitchen in Hollywood." Mr. Jensen stepped down as CEO in 2009. He is the author of The Craft of Computer Programming (New York: Warner Books, 1985) ISBN 978-0-446-38147-5.

Craig Jensen is a member of the Church of Scientology and a member of the World Institute of Scientology Enterprises (WISE), an international membership organization whose members use the management technology of L. Ron Hubbard, founder of the Church of Scientology. He has stated that his employees are schooled in Hubbard's management technology, with courses that include Effective Leadership, Executives and Ethics, Executive Basics and Management by Statistics.

=== Controversy ===
In 1991, the company (back then Executive Software) refused to renew technical support for Ciba-Geigy’s VAX version of Diskeeper after learning that Ciba-Geigy makes Ritalin, a drug that was linked with suicide in children. Jensen told Digital News that Executive Software would honor its contractual obligations with Ciba-Geigy, which had purchased a 12-month update service. However, it would not renew the service or the software once the agreement expired. ‘Ciba-Geigy slipped through,’ said Jensen. ‘But I think someone should take a stand on this, and I'm willing to do so.'

In 2000, the inclusion of the functionality of the Home version of Diskeeper in Microsoft Windows 2000's Disk Defragmenter was the subject of an investigation by the German Federal Office of Security in Information Technology (BSI), which looked into whether Diskeeper poses a security threat to users by spying on users. In Germany the law bars state and federal governments from doing business with a member of the Church of Scientology. A Microsoft spokesman stated that Microsoft had extensively tested Diskeeper for security breaches and found the tool had no ability to store and transmit data on users and there was no data transfer involved in its processes, but decided to give users the option to remove it.

=== Legal issues ===
On November 5, 2008, Diskeeper's former CIO, Alexander Godelman, and Automation Planning Officer Marc Le Shay jointly filed suit in Los Angeles Superior Court for improper dismissal. In the complaint they allege that the company required training in Hubbard Management courses, which are based on the management technology of L. Ron Hubbard, founder of Scientology, as a condition of employment, and that failure to comply was cause for their dismissal. The plaintiffs cited this as a violation of the California Fair Employment and Housing Act and requested an injunction against the delivery of the courses at Diskeeper. On January 27, 2009, Diskeeper filed a motion to strike the proposed injunction, citing, without conceding that Hubbard Management Technology is religious in nature, legal precedence of religious based practices in business being protected by the First Amendment. On February 18, 2009, the motion to strike was granted and the proposed injunction removed from the case. On June 24, 2009, the case was dismissed in its entirety.

Diskeeper later won an arbitration award against the attorney of Godelman and LeShay, Barry B. Kaufman. Kaufman refused to return material back to Diskeeper and used it in another deposition, breaching the terms of the settlement agreement with Godelman and LeShay. The arbitrator further found that Kaufman breached his duty of confidentiality under paragraph 9(A) of the settlement agreement by using Diskeeper's training documents during the deposition and showing them to his co-counsel; in addition, the arbitrator determined that Kaufman made a negligent misrepresentation when he told Diskeeper that Godelman and LeShay had returned all the documents required under the settlement agreement. The arbitrator concluded that Diskeeper was entitled to an order directing the return of Diskeeper's documents, an award of $70,000 "in liquidated damages" from Kaufman, and an award of attorney fees.

On April 4, 2012, the arbitrator issued his final award, which incorporated the interim award and contained findings regarding Diskeeper's attorney fees and costs. The arbitrator determined that Diskeeper was entitled to $297,000 in attorney fees and $88,034.69 in costs and expenses. The arbitrator further stated: "Because Diskeeper prevailed against Godelman because of the acts, omissions and advice of his agent and attorney, Kaufman, it would be inequitable to award [the fees, costs, and expenses] against Godelman as well. Accordingly, the award is assessed only against Kaufman."

== Products ==
Condusiv Technologies sells and supports a number of software products. Diskeeper, a tool for reducing file fragmentation; V-locity Virtual Machine, a platform disk optimizer for virtual server; Undelete, which offers protection from and recovery of accidentally deleted files.

Condusiv sells its products to OEMs (original equipment manufacturers) including SanDisk, Samsung and LG. Condusiv OEM products include ExpressCache, which exploits a small-density SSD as a cache for a larger-capacity HDD, thus improving boot times and applications launch.

The company also has several technologies such as HyperFast, a solid-state drive optimizer, HyperBoot, a boot-time optimization technology; and InvisiTasking, which enables any process to run invisibly in the background.

Another technology introduced by the company in 2009 is IntelliWrite, an advanced file-system driver designed to leverage Windows’ file system “Best Fit” file-write design in order to write a file in a non-fragmented state. IntelliWrite is designed to prevent most fragmentation before it happens in Windows computer systems, allowing for better file write performance plus compatibility and interoperability with other storage management products.
