= Raxco =

Defunct software company in Gaithersburg, Maryland, US

Raxco Software, Inc.
- Raxco Software, Inc.
- Industry: Software
- Founded: 1978
- Defunct: May 2024
- Products: PerfectDisk, PerfectUpdater, PerfectRegistry, PerfectGuard, InstantRescue, PerfectFileRecovery
- Website: www.raxco.com

Raxco Software Inc. was a Gaithersburg, Maryland software company. Founded in 1978, the company's products were sold internationally.

In 1995, a division of the company was split into the spin-off company Axent Technologies, which was later acquired by Symantec in 2000. Raxco continued with its own product offerings. PerfectDisk becoming its flagship software package.

Raxco transitioned away from its 1980s and 1990s VAX/pre-OpenVMS VMS and OpenVMS software product lines, and became private after a management buyout in 2001.

== Interim ownerships ==
From the later 1990s through the early 2000s, corporate ownership of the two organizations transitioned:

- 1995: Axent is formed as a spin-off company of Raxco
- 1995-2000: Axent Technologies Inc functions as an independent company
- 2000: Axent is acquired by Symantec
- 2001: Raxco becomes private after a management buyout.

Raxco then changed its course from VAX/VMS to the PC/Server industry in 2003.

Raxco closed operations in May, 2024. All their standalone products will continue to work, but no product activations will be made, and no updates or support will be offered. Subscription-based products will remain functional until their expiration date.

== History ==
During the 1980s, using the collective name RAXCO Rabbit Software, the company marketed a series of nine software packages for the VAX:

- Resource Accounting
- Capacity Planner / Performance Analyzer
- Disk Monitor
- High-Speed Backup
- Disk-Optimizer (Note: prior to PerfectDisk, which came a decade or so later!)
- Report Generator
- System Accelerator (Note: full title: V.A.S.T. - VAX Accelerator Software Technology)

Raxco's VAX product line was still active in the 1990s, even as it was building and expanding its PC Product line. By 2003 the PC desktop and server market became the company's focus.

== Product line ==
Aside from PerfectDisk, the company also marketed:

- PerfectUpdater - improves system stability/minimizes hardware conflicts by detecting/installing appropriate drivers for unknown devices
- PerfectRegistry - Fix registry errors that slow down booting up (Note: noting that it "automatically creates a system restore point before fixing anything so you can undo the changes if needed.")
- PerfectGuard - Blocks/removes spyware, helps protect privacy
- InstantRescue - quicker rollback/system restore
- PerfectFileRecovery - an advanced undelete tool
