= Diskeeper =

Hard-drive defragmentation program

- Screenshot of Diskeeper 2010 Pro Premier
- Developer(s): Condusiv Technologies
- Final release: 2020 (20.0.1302) (March 23, 2020) [±]
- Operating system: Windows 95 and later; Windows Server 2003 and later
- Platform: IA-32 and x64
- Successor: DymaxIO
- Type: Defragmentation software
- License: Discontinued (formerly trialware)
- Website: condusiv.com

Diskeeper is a discontinued defragmentation app, designed for Microsoft Windows. It was developed by Executive Software International, Inc., which later changed its name to Diskeeper Corporation, and is now called Condusiv Technologies. The final version of Diskeeper was released in March 2020. All of Diskeeper's features and functionality are now included in Condusiv's data performance software DymaxIO.

== History ==
Originally, Diskeeper was developed for the VAX series of minicomputers and later for Microsoft Windows. The defragmentation program which is included with Windows 2000, Windows XP and Windows Server 2003 is based on a basic version of Diskeeper. Diskeeper 9.0 (for Windows 2000 and XP) Server Edition introduced Terabyte Volume Engine (TVE), which provides optimal defragmentation performance on volumes of 1 TB and larger. Diskeeper 2008 Professional introduced a Volume Shadow Copy Service (VSS) compatibility mode, which defragments on a unit of 16 KB, so that VSS file history won't explode, invalidating cached old versions of the files.

== Features ==
In addition to resolving file system fragmentation, Diskeeper also prevents fragmentation before it happens by optimizing the process of data being written to disk. Diskeeper can also defragment files on-the-fly, using only idle system resources as needed.

Another feature in Diskeeper is I-FAAST, or Intelligent File Access Acceleration Sequencing Technology. I-FAAST determines the frequency of file usage and the most frequently used files are then moved to the best portion of the disc. According to Diskeeper, this results in faster file access and also helps prevent future fragmentation of those files. The I-FAAST feature is available in Professional, Pro Premier and Server editions.

There were six versions available: Home, Professional, Pro Premier, HomeServer, Server, and EnterpriseServer. Diskeeper Administrator is also available to manage Diskeeper options as well as perform advanced installations. Version 10 was the last version available for Windows 9x. After version 10, Diskeeper versions followed the year based naming convention, that is, 2007, 2008 and so on.

== Critical reception ==
Diskeeper 2009 won Editor's Best Gold Award and Community's Choice Bronze Award for best system utility of 2009 from Windows IT Pro. Diskeeper 2010 however, only managed to achieve Editor's Best Bronze Award for best system utility of 2010.

== See also ==
- Comparison of defragmentation software
- List of defragmentation software
