= List of assembly software and tools =

Assembly-language programming and binary-analysis tools

This is a list of assembly software and tools, including software used for assembly language programming, machine code generation, disassembly, debugging, binary analysis, reverse engineering, and instruction-set simulation.

== Assemblers and machine-code generators ==
Name	Type	Main scope	Notes
GNU Assembler	Assembler	Multiple architectures	The GNU assembler, commonly invoked as as, is part of GNU Binutils and is used with GNU toolchains.
NASM	Assembler and disassembler	x86 and x86-64	NASM is an assembler for the Intel x86 architecture and supports multiple object-file formats.
MASM	Macro assembler	x86 and x64	Microsoft's Macro Assembler includes a macro language and is documented as part of Microsoft's C++ build tools.
FASM	Assembler	x86 and x86-64	Flat assembler is a multi-pass assembler for x86-family processors.
Yasm	Assembler	x86 and AMD64	Yasm is a modular assembler that supports NASM and GAS syntax.
High Level Assembler	Mainframe assembler	IBM z/OS, z/VM and z/VSE	IBM High Level Assembler is used for assembler-language development on IBM mainframe operating systems.
LLVM-MC	Machine-code tool	Multiple architectures supported by LLVM	llvm-mc takes assembly code for a specified architecture as input and can generate object files or executables, encode instructions, and disassemble byte strings.
Keystone Engine	Assembler framework	Multiple architectures	Keystone is a lightweight multi-platform assembler framework with bindings for several programming languages.

== Disassemblers and binary-analysis tools ==
Name	Type	Main scope	Notes
GNU objdump	Object-file utility and disassembler	Multiple object formats and architectures	objdump can display information from object files and can be used for disassembly.
LLVM-objdump	Object-file utility and disassembler	Multiple object formats and architectures	llvm-objdump prints the contents of object files and linked images and includes disassembly options.
DUMPBIN	Object-file utility and disassembler	COFF, PE and related Microsoft binary formats	The Microsoft DUMPBIN /DISASM option displays disassembly of code sections in native files.
Capstone	Disassembly framework	Multiple architectures	Capstone is a lightweight multi-platform, multi-architecture disassembly framework used in binary analysis and reverse engineering.
Ghidra	Reverse-engineering suite	Multiple architectures and executable formats	Ghidra is a software reverse-engineering framework created and maintained by the National Security Agency Research Directorate.
IDA Pro	Disassembler, decompiler and debugger	Multiple processor families	IDA Pro is a commercial, multi-platform and multi-processor disassembler used for debugging and reverse engineering compiled programs.
radare2	Reverse-engineering framework	Multiple architectures and binary formats	radare2 is a command-line reverse-engineering toolkit with libraries, tools and scripting interfaces.
Binary Ninja	Disassembler and binary-analysis tool	Multiple architectures and binary formats	Binary Ninja is a disassembler used for reverse-engineering tasks and binary analysis.

== Debuggers with assembly-level features ==
Name	Type	Main scope	Notes
GDB	Debugger	Multiple architectures	GDB can display machine instructions with its disassemble command and can map source lines to program addresses.
LLDB	Debugger	Multiple architectures	LLDB is a debugger in the LLVM project and uses LLVM components including the LLVM disassembler.
OllyDbg	Assembly-level debugger	32-bit Windows x86 programs	OllyDbg is an assembler-level analyzing debugger for Microsoft Windows, with emphasis on binary code analysis.
edb	Graphical debugger	AArch32, x86 and x86-64	edb is a cross-platform debugger inspired by OllyDbg.

== Educational IDEs, simulators and emulators ==
Name	Type	Main scope	Notes
SPIM	Simulator and debugger	MIPS32	SPIM is a self-contained simulator that reads and executes MIPS32 assembly language programs.
MARS	Educational IDE and simulator	MIPS	MARS is a lightweight interactive development environment for programming in MIPS assembly language.
RARS	Assembler and runtime simulator	RISC-V	RARS assembles and simulates RISC-V assembly language programs and is intended for people getting started with RISC-V.
emu8086	Emulator and assembler	Intel 8086	emu8086 is an 8086 microprocessor emulator with an integrated assembler, often used for educational assembly-language programming.

== Portable and intermediate assembly-like languages ==
Name	Type	Main use	Notes
WebAssembly	Portable bytecode and text format	Web and server-side applications	A low-level, assembly-like compilation target designed for portable execution.
LLVM IR	Intermediate representation	Compiler optimization and code generation	The LLVM language reference describes LLVM IR as an SSA-based assembly language used throughout the LLVM compilation strategy.
MLIR	Multi-level intermediate representation	Compiler infrastructure for heterogeneous hardware and domain-specific compilers	An LLVM subproject for building reusable and extensible compiler infrastructure across multiple levels of abstraction.
SPIR-V	Binary intermediate language	Graphics shaders and compute kernels	A standardized intermediate form used by APIs such as Vulkan, OpenGL, and OpenCL.

== Assembly language families ==
Assembly language is not a single programming language, but a family of low-level languages associated with particular instruction set architectures and processor families.

Examples include:

- AArch64 assembly
- ARB assembly language
- ARM assembly
- AVR assembly
- Autocoder
- COMPASS
- High Level Assembly
- Honeywell ARGUS
- IBM 1401 Symbolic Programming System
- IBM Basic assembly language and successors
- System/360 assembly
- IBM Z assembly
- 8051 assembly
- MACRO-10
- MACRO-11
- MIPS assembly
- 6800 assembly
- 68HC08 assembly
- 68HC11 assembly
- 68000 assembly
- 6502 assembly
- MSP430 assembly
- Parrot assembly language
- PIC assembly
- PowerPC assembly
- RISC-V assembly
- SPARC assembly
- Typed assembly language
- VAX MACRO
- 65C02 assembly
- 65C816 assembly
- x86 assembly
- x86-64 assembly
- Z80 assembly
- Z8000 assembly

== See also ==
- Assembler (computing)
- Comparison of assemblers
- Executable and Linkable Format
- Instruction set architecture
- List of software programmed in assembly language
- Lists of programming software development tools
- Mach-O
- Object file
- Opcode
- Portable Executable
- Software programmed in assembly language
