= SASM =

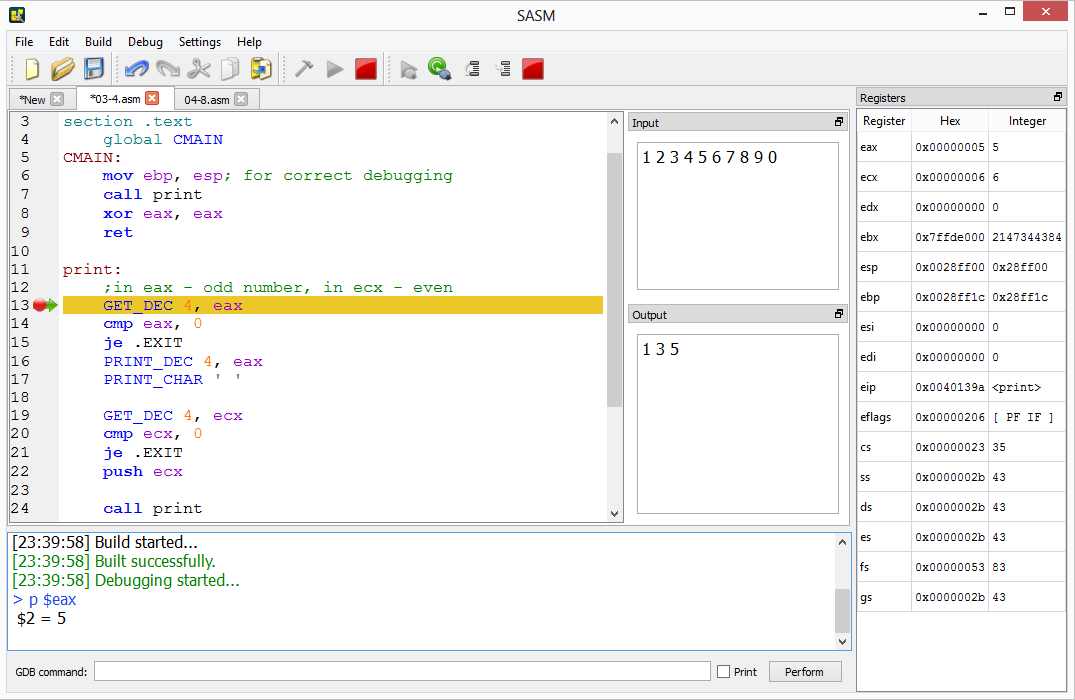
- Developer: Dmitriy Manushin (Dman95)
- Stable release: 3.16.0 / 8 February 2026; 0 days ago
- Repository: github.com/Dman95/SASM
- Operating system: Windows, Linux
- Type: IDE
- License: GPL
- Website: dman95.github.io/SASM/english.html

SASM (short for SimpleASM) is a free and open source cross-platform integrated development environment for the NASM, MASM, GAS and FASM assembly languages. It features syntax highlighting and includes a debugger.

SASM is intended to allow users to easily develop and run programs written in assembly language. It was written by Dmitriy "Dman95" Manushin and licensed under the GNU GPL v3.0. It is written in C++ and uses the multi-platform Qt toolkit.

== Features ==
- Four assemblers - NASM, MASM, GAS and FASM are supported
- Syntax highlighting with tunable color scheme
- Handy graphical debugger
- Program is translated into Russian, English, Turkish, Chinese, German, Italian, Polish, Hebrew, Spanish, Portuguese, French, Brazilian Portuguese, Japanese
- Input/output macro library
- Ability to work with multiple files using tabs
- All required components are included (gdb, gcc, nasm, masm, fasm, gas)
