= Comparison of assemblers =

This is an incomplete comparison of assemblers. Some assemblers are components of a compiler system for a high-level programming language and may have limited or no usable functionality outside of the compiler system. Some assemblers are hosted on the target processor and operating system, while other assemblers (cross-assemblers) may run under an unrelated operating system or processor. For example, assemblers for embedded systems are not usually hosted on the target system since it would not have the storage and terminal I/O to permit entry of a program from a keyboard. An assembler may have a single target processor or may have options to support multiple processor types.

== As part of a compiler suite ==
- GNU Assembler (GAS): GPL: many target instruction sets, including ARM architecture, Atmel AVR, x86, x86-64, RISC-V, Freescale 68HC11, Freescale v4e, Motorola 680x0, MIPS, PowerPC, IBM System z, TI MSP430, Zilog Z80.
- SDAS (fork of ASxxxx Cross Assemblers and part of the Small Device C Compiler project): GPL: several target instruction sets including Intel 8051, Zilog Z80, Freescale 68HC08, PIC microcontroller.
- The Amsterdam Compiler Kit (ACK) targets many architectures of the 1980s, including 6502, 6800, 680x0, ARM, x86, Zilog Z80 and Z8000.
- LLVM targets many platforms, however its main focus is not machine-dependent code generation; instead a more high-level typed assembly-like intermediate representation is used. Nevertheless for the most common targets the LLVM MC (machine code) project provides an assembler both as an integrated component of the compilers and as an external tool.
- Some other self-hosted native-targeted language implementations (like Go, Free Pascal, SBCL) have their own assemblers with multiple targets. They may be used for inline assembly inside the language, or even included as a library, but aren't always suitable for being used outside of their framework - no command-line tool exists, or only the intermediate representation can be used as their input, or the set of supported targets is very limited.

== Single target assemblers ==
=== 6502 assemblers ===
Assembler	Developer	FOSS	License	Instruction set	Host platform
Atari Assembler Editor	Shepardson Microsystems	No	Proprietary	MOS Technology 6502	Atari 8-bit
Atari Macro Assembler	Shepardson Microsystems	No	Proprietary	MOS Technology 6502	Atari 8-bit
EDASM	Apple Computer	No	?	MOS Technology 6502	Apple DOS 3.x
k2asm	Andre Kaesmacher, Hauke Brandes, Börje Sieling	Yes	Artistic License	MOS Technology 6502	Linux, Windows, macOS, possibly other Unices
Lisa	Randall Hyde	No	Proprietary	MOS Technology 6502	Apple II
MAC/65	Optimized Systems Software	No	Proprietary	MOS Technology 6502, WDC 65C02	Atari 8-bit
Merlin	Glen Bredon	Yes	Public-domain	MOS Technology 6502, WDC 65C02	Apple II
ORCA/M	The Byte Works	No	Proprietary, Free for non-commercial use	MOS Technology 6502, WDC 65C02, WDC 65C816	ProDOS 8/16, GS/OS
RMAC	James Hammons, George Nakos, Landon Dyer	Yes	Free	MOS Technology 6502	Linux, Windows, macOS
SynAssembler	Synapse Software	No	Proprietary	MOS Technology 6502	Atari 8-bit
VASM	Volker Barthelmann, Frank Wille	No	Free	MOS Technology 6502	various
xa65	Cameron Kaiser, André Fachat	Yes	GPL	MOS Technology 6502, WDC 65C02, WDC 65C816	Linux, various
XASM	Piotr Fusik	Yes	Free	MOS Technology 6502	Linux, Windows, macOS

=== 680x0 assemblers ===
Assembler	Developer	FOSS	License	Instruction set	Host platform	Development active
ASM-One Macro Assembler	Rune Gram-Madsen	No	Free	Motorola 680x0	Commodore Amiga	No
GAS	GNU Project	Yes	Free	Motorola 680x0	various	Yes
VASM	Volker Barthelmann, Frank Wille	No	Proprietary	Motorola 680x0	various	Yes
RMAC	James Hammons, George Nakos, Landon Dyer	Yes	Free	Motorola 680x0, MOS Technology 6502	Linux, Windows, macOS	Yes

=== ARM assemblers ===
Assembler	Developer	FOSS	License	Host platform	ARM64
GAS	GNU Project	Yes	GNU GPL	various	Yes
TCCASM	Fabrice Bellard	Yes	GNU LGPL	Unix-like, Windows	Yes
VASM	Volker Barthelmann, Frank Wille	No	Free	various	No
FASMARM	revolution, Tomasz Grysztar	Yes	Simplified BSD with weak copyleft	Windows, DOS, Linux, Unix-like	No
ARMIPS	Kingcom	Yes	MIT	various	No

=== RISC-V assemblers ===
Assembler	Developer	FOSS	License	Host platform	RISC-V
GAS	GNU Project	Yes	GNU GPL	various	Yes
TCCASM	Fabrice Bellard	Yes	GNU LGPL	Unix-like, Windows	Yes

=== Mainframe Assemblers ===
Assembler	Developer	FOSS	License	Instruction set	Host platform
Assembly Language for Multics (ALM)		Yes	MIT	GE-645; Honeywell 6180	GE-645; Honeywell 6180
705 Autocoder	IBM		Free	IBM 705	
1410/7010 OS Autocoder	IBM		Free	IBM 1410; 7010	IBM 1410 Processor Operating System (1410-PR-155)
7070/7074 Autocoder	IBM		Free	IBM 7070; IBM 7072; 7074	
7080 Autocoder III	IBM		Free	IBM 7080	IBM 7058 Processor
COMPASS	Control Data Corporation		Free	CDC lower 3000 series	CDC MASTER; MSOS; RTS OS; SCOPE
COMPASS	Control Data Corporation		Free	CDC upper 3000 series	CDC SCOPE
COMPASS	Control Data Corporation		Free	CDC 6000 series 7600; Cyber 70, 170	CDC Kronos; NOS; NOS/BE; SCOPE
Fortran Assembly Program (FAP)	David E. Ferguson, Donald P. Moore		Free	IBM 709, 704x, 709x	Fortran Monitor System, IBSYS
GCOS Macro Assembly Program (GMAP)	General Electric		Free	GE-600 series, Honeywell 6000 series	GCOS
Macro Assembly Program (MAP)	IBM		Free	IBM 709, 704x, 709x	IBSYS/IBJOB on 709, 704x, 709x
Symbolic Assembly Program (SAP)	United Aircraft		Free	IBM 704	IBM 704
IBM Basic Assembly Language (BAL)	IBM		Free	IBM System/360	IBM BPS/360
ASSIST	Penn State University	Public Domain	Free	IBM System/360	MVS
UNIVAC VS/9 Assembler	Unisys		Proprietary	Univac 9060 and 9070 (Similar to IBM System/370)	VS/9
BS2000 Assembler H	Fujitsu		Proprietary	Fujitsu Technology Series SE (Similar to IBM System/370)	BS2000
z390 Portable Mainframe Assembler	Don Higgins	GPL	Free	Simulated IBM System/370	Simulated MVS
IBM High-Level Assembler (HLASM)	IBM	—N/a	Proprietary	IBM System/370. z/Architecture	z/OS, z/VSE, z/VM
IBM Assembler D	IBM		Free	IBM System/360	IBM OS/360
IBM Assembler E	IBM		Free	IBM System/360	IBM OS/360
IBM Assembler F	IBM		Free	IBM System/360	IBM OS/360 and CP-67/CMS
Assembler G	University of Waterloo		Free	IBM System/360 and others (table-driven)	IBM OS/360 and CP-67/CMS
IBM Assembler H	IBM	—N/a	Proprietary	IBM System/360 and System/370	IBM OS/360 and successors
IBM Assembler XF	IBM		Free	IBM System/370	numerous
PL/360	Niklaus Wirth	Yes	Free	IBM System/360	IBM OS/360
Meta-Symbol	Scientific Data Systems (SDS)		Free	SDS Sigma series	BTM, UTS, CP-V
Xerox Assembly Program (AP)	Xerox Data Systems		Free	SDS Sigma series, Xerox 500 series	CP-V CP-R
Meta Assembler (MASM)	UNIVAC		Free	UNIVAC 1100/2200 series	UNIVAC EXEC 8

=== POWER, PowerPC, and Power ISA assemblers ===
Assembler	Developer	FOSS	License	Instruction set	Host platform
GAS	GNU Project	Yes	GNU GPL	POWER, PowerPC 74xx, PowerPC 970	All platforms supported by GNU Binutils
IBM AIX assembler	IBM	No	Proprietary	POWER	IBM AIX
VASM	Volker Barthelmann, Frank Wille	No	Free	POWER, 40x, 440, 460, 6xx, 7xx, 7xxx, 860, Book-E, e300 and e500	various

=== x86 assemblers ===
Assembler	Developer	Host platform	FOSS	License	x86-64	Development active
A86/A386	Eric Isaacson	Windows, DOS	No	Proprietary	No	No
ACK	Andrew Tanenbaum, Ceriel Jacobs	Linux, MINIX, Unix-like	Yes	BSD since 2003	No	1985-?
IBM ALP	IBM	OS/2	No	Proprietary	No	No
Intel ASM86	Intel	DOS	No	Proprietary	No	No
AT&T	AT&T	Unix System V	No	Proprietary	No	1985-?
Digital Research RASM-86 Relocating Assembler	Digital Research	CP/M-86, DOS, Intel's ISIS and iRMX	No	Proprietary	No	1978-1992
EuroAssembler	Pavel "vitsoft" Šrubař	Windows, Linux	Yes	Freeware	Yes	Yes
FASM	Tomasz Grysztar	Windows, DOS, Linux, Unix-like	Yes	Simplified BSD with weak copyleft	Yes	Yes
GAS	GNU Project	Unix-like, Windows, DOS, OS/2	Yes	GNU GPLv3	Yes	Since 1987
HLA	Randall Hyde	Windows, Linux, FreeBSD, macOS	Yes	Public domain	No	No
Open Watcom Assembler (HJWASM a.k.a. UASM, JWASM, WASM)	Watcom	Linux, Windows, DOS, FreeBSD, OS/2	approved by OSI, but not by FSF	Sybase Open Watcom Public	Yes	Yes
MASM	Microsoft	Windows, DOS, OS/2	No	Microsoft EULA	Yes	Since 1981
NASM	Simon Tatham, Julian Hall, Hans Peter Anvin, et al.	Linux, macOS, Windows, DOS, OS/2	Yes	BSD	Yes	Yes
POASM		Windows, Windows Mobile	No	Freeware	Yes	Yes
Tim Paterson's ASM	Tim Paterson	86-DOS, DOS DEBUG	No	Proprietary	No	1979-1983
TASM	Borland	Windows, DOS	No	Proprietary	No	?
TCCASM	Fabrice Bellard	Unix-like, Windows	Yes	GNU LGPL	Yes	No
VASM	Volker Barthelmann, Frank Wille	various	No	Free	Yes	Yes
86-Assembler for DOS	Stephen Duffy	DOS	Yes	GPL2	No	No
Xenix	Microsoft	Xenix 2.3 and 3.0 (before 1985)	No	Proprietary	No	1982-1984
Yasm	Peter Johnson	Windows, DOS, Linux, Unix-like	Yes	BSD	Yes	No
SASM (Small Assembler)	Intiha	Compiled on Linux Tested on Windows	Yes	GPL v3	Yes	No
Zero (ZASM)	Damian Suess	Windows, DOS	Yes	MIT License	Yes	Yes

1. Part of the MINIX 3 source tree, but without obvious development activity.
2. Developed by Interactive Systems Corporation in 1986 when they ported UNIX System V to Intel iAPX286 and 80386 architectures. Archetypical of ATT syntax because it was used as a reference for GAS. Still used for The SCO Group's products, UnixWare and OpenServer.
3. Active, supported, but unadvertised.
4. Part of the C++Builder Tool Chain, but not sold as a stand-alone product, or marketed since the CodeGear spin-off; Borland was still selling it until then. Version 5.0, the last, is dated 1996.
5. Turbo Assembler was developed as Turbo Editasm by Uriah Barnett from Speedware Inc (Sacramento, CA) between 1984 and 1987, then later sold to, or marketed by, Borland as their Turbo Assembler.
6. Last stable version 1.3.0 was released in August 2014, and low maintenance since then: https://github.com/yasm/yasm

=== Z80 assemblers ===
Assembler	Developer	Host platform	FOSS	License	Development active
Microsoft MACRO-80	Microsoft	CP/M, ISIS-II, TRSDOS, TEKDOS, MSX-DOS	No	Commercial	No
Zeus Assembler	Crystal Computing	ZX Spectrum	No	Commercial	No
z80asm	Peter Kollner, Paul Flo Williams, John Critchley, Bas Wijnen	Unix-like, Windows	Yes	GNU GPL	No
Pasmo	Julián Albo	Unix-like, Windows	Yes	GNU GPL	No
sjasmplus	Sjoerd Mastijn, Aprisobal, Peter Helcmanovský, ...	Unix-like, Windows	Yes	BSD	Yes
Rasm	Berge Edouard	Unix-like, Windows	Yes	MIT	Yes

=== Other single target assemblers ===
Assembler	Developer	FOSS	License	Instruction set	Host platform
Autocoder	IBM		Free	IBM 1401, 1440, 1460	IBM 1401, 1440, 1460
Autocoder	IBM		Free	IBM 1410, 7010	1410/7010 Operating System (1410-PR-155)
Babbage		No	Proprietary	GEC 4000 series	GEC 4000 series
City & Guilds Mnemonic Code	City and Guilds of London Institute	No	?	City & Guilds Computer	ICL 1900, Elliot 900
MACRO-10	Digital Equipment Corporation		Free	PDP-10	PDP-10
MACRO-11	Digital Equipment Corporation		Free	PDP-11	PDP-11
VAX MACRO	Digital Equipment Corporation		Proprietary	VAX, Alpha	OpenVMS
VASM	Volker Barthelmann, Frank Wille	No	Free	Zilog Z80, Motorola 6800 family	various
GPASM	James Bowman, Craig Franklin, David Barnett	Yes	GNU GPL	PIC microcontroller	many
MIPS			Free	MIPS	MIPS
Rednex Game Boy Development System (RGBDS)		Yes	MIT License	Game Boy, Game Boy Color	many
Symbolic Optimal Assembly Program (SOAP)	IBM		Free	IBM 650	IBM 650
Technical Assembly System (TASS)			Free	IBM 650	IBM 650
Symbolic Programming System (SPS)	Gary Mokotoff		Free	IBM 14xx	IBM 1401, 1440, 1460
Symbolic Programming System (SPS)			Free	IBM 1620, 1710	IBM 1620, 1710
ASMB, ASBL, NSBL - Numeric op codes, used for 1900 Operating System Executive		No	Proprietary	ICL 1900	ICL 1900
GINerator mnemonic opcodes, used for GEORGE (operating system)		No	Proprietary	ICL 1900	ICL 1900
PLAN mnemonic opcodes, used for commercial 1900 programs		No	Proprietary	ICL 1900	ICL 1900
Single Address Assembly Language (SAAL)			Free	UNIVAC 1005	UNIVAC 1005
Sleuth			Free	UNIVAC 1107	EXEC, EXEC II, EXEC 8
Meta Assembler (MASM)			Free	UNIVAC 1100/2200 series	UNIVAC EXEC 8
UTMOST			?	UNIVAC III	UNIVAC III

== Retargetable/cross-assemblers ==
Assembler	Developer	FOSS	License	Instruction set	Host platform
The Macroassembler AS	Alfred Arnold		Free	29xxx, AVR, 65816, ACE, F2MC-8L, F2MC-16L, HMCS400, 6301, 6309, H8/300(H), H8/500, SH7000 / SH7600 / SH7700, HuC6280, PPC403GA, 4004/4040, 8008, MCS-48, MCS-41, MCS-51, MCS-251, MCS-96/196/296, 8080/8085, [	Win32, DOS/DPMI, DOS (no longer maintained), OS/2 (no longer maintained), Linux
ASxxxx Cross Assemblers	Alan R. Baldwin	Yes	GNU GPL	1802, S2650, SC/MP, MPS430, 6100, 61860, 6500, 6800(6802/6808), 6801(6803/HD6303), 6804, 6805, 68HC(S)08, 6809, 68HC11, 68HC(S)12, 68HC16, 740, 78K/0, 78K/0S, 8008, 8008S, 8048(8041/8022/8021), 8051, 8085(8080), AT89LP, 8X300(8X305), DS8XCXXX, AVR, EZ80, F2MC8L/FX, F8/3870, Game Boy(sm83), H8/3xx, Cypress PSoC(M8C), PIC, Rabbit 2000/3000, ST6, ST7, ST8, Z8, Z80(HD64180), and Z280 series	Win32, DOS, Linux, Android
