= RISC-V assembly language =

Assembly languages for the RISC-V computer architecture

- Filename extension: .s
- Developed by: RISC-V Foundation
- Type of format: Assembly language
- Open format?: Yes
- Free format?: Yes
- Website: riscv.org/specifications/ratified/

RISC-V assembly language is a low-level programming language that is used to produce object code for the RISC-V class of processors. Assembly languages are closely tied to the architecture's machine code instructions, allowing for precise control over hardware.

Assemblers include GNU Assembler and LLVM.

== Keywords ==
Reserved keywords of RISC-V assembly language.

- add
- addi
- and
- andi
- beq
- bge
- bgeu
- blt
- bltu
- bne
- lb
- lbu
- lh
- lhu
- lw
- or
- ori
- sb
- sh
- sll
- slli
- slt
- slti
- sltiu
- sltu
- sra
- srai
- srl
- srli
- sub
- sw
- xor
- xori

== Mnemonics and opcodes ==
Each instruction in the RISC-V assembly language is represented by a mnemonic which often combines with one or more operands to translate into one or more bytes known as an opcode.

== Registers ==
RISC-V processors feature a set of registers that serve as storage for binary data and addresses during program execution. These registers are categorized into integer registers and floating-point registers.

== Instruction types ==
RISC-V instructions use variable-length encoding.

Extensions:

- atomic instructions
- single-precision floating-point
- double-precision floating-point
- bit manipulation
- cryptography
- hypervisor
- supervisor
- packed-SIMD instructions
- vector

=== Floating-point instructions ===
RISC-V assembly language includes instructions for a floating-point unit (FPU).

=== SIMD instructions ===
These largely perform the same operation in parallel on many values.

== Program flow ==
The RISC-V assembly has conditional branch instructions based on comparison: beq (equal), bne (not equal), blt (less than, signed), bltu (less than, unsigned), bge (greater than or equal, signed), and bgeu (greater than or equal, unsigned).

== Examples ==
.section .text
.globl _start
_start:
	    lui  a1,      %hi(msg)       # load msg(hi)
	    addi a1, a1,  %lo(msg)       # load msg(lo)
	    jalr ra, puts
2:	    j    2b

.section .rodata
msg:
	    .string "Hello World\n"

== See also ==
- Assembly language
- RISC-V ecosystem
- RISC-V instruction listings
- CPU design
- List of assemblers
- x86 assembly language
