= FASM =

Open source assembler for x86 processors

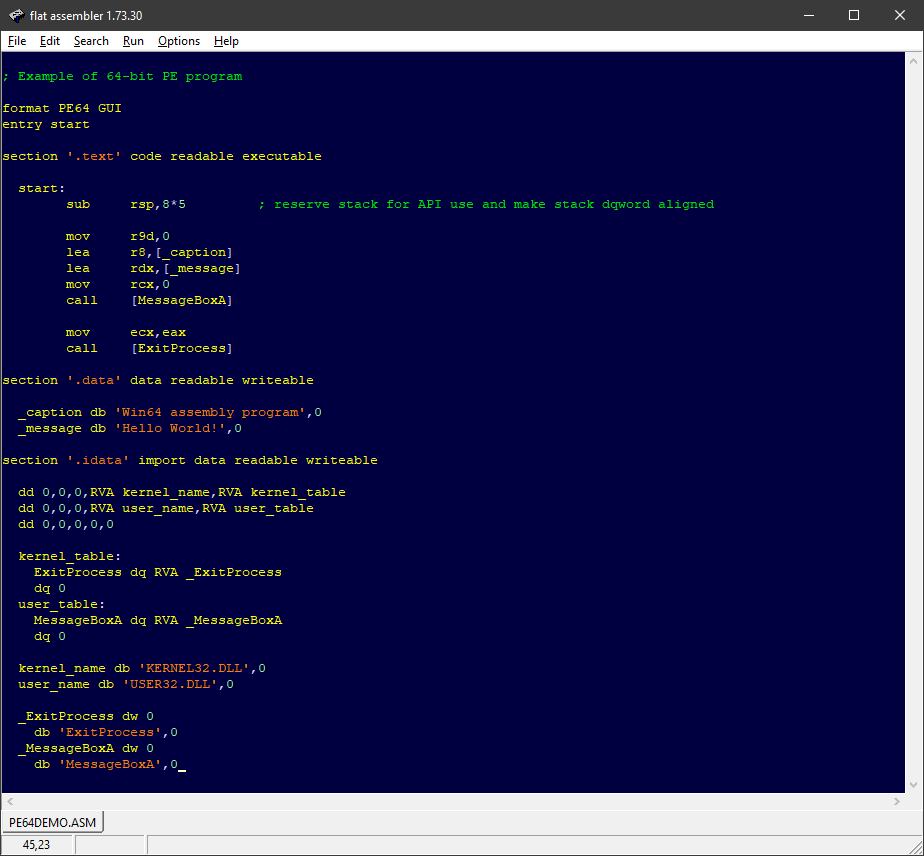
- Screenshot with supplied example
- Developer: Tomasz Grysztar
- Release: March 2000; 26 years ago
- Stable release: 1.73.35 / 24 February 2026; 6 months ago
- Written in: Assembly
- Operating system: Unix-like, Linux, Windows and IDE, MS-DOS and IDE, OpenBSD, etc., MenuetOS, KolibriOS, OctaOS, DexOS and IDE, SkyOS, Solar_OS
- Platform: x86, x86-64
- Type: Assembler
- License: Simplified BSD with a weak copyleft clause
- Website: flatassembler.net
- Repository: github.com/tgrysztar/fasm

FASM (flat assembler) is an assembler for x86 processors. It supports Intel-style assembly language on the IA-32 and x86-64 computer architectures. It claims high speed, size optimizations, operating system (OS) portability, and macro abilities. It is a low-level assembler and intentionally uses very few command-line options. It is free and open-source software.

All versions of FASM can directly output any of the following: flat "raw" binary (usable also as MS-DOS COM executable or SYS driver), objects: Executable and Linkable Format (ELF) or Common Object File Format (COFF) (classic or MS-specific), or executables in either MZ, ELF, or Portable Executable (PE) format (including WDM drivers, allows custom MZ DOS stub). An unofficial port targeting the ARM architecture also exists.

== History ==
The project was started in 1999 by Tomasz Grysztar, a.k.a. Privalov, at that time an undergraduate student of mathematics from Poland. It was released publicly in March 2000. FASM is completely written in assembly language and comes with full source. It is self-hosting and has been able to assemble itself since version 0.90 (May 4, 1999).

FASM originally ran in 16-bit flat real mode. 32-bit support was added and then supplemented with optional DPMI support. Designed to be easy to port to any operating system with flat 32-bit addressing, it was ported to Windows, then Linux.

== Design ==
FASM does not support as many high-level statements as MASM or TASM. It provides syntax features and macros, which make it possible to customize or create missing statements. Its memory-addressing syntax is similar to TASM's ideal mode and NASM. Brackets are used to denote memory operands as in both assemblers, but their size is placed outside the brackets, like in NASM.

FASM is a multi-pass assembler. It makes extensive code-size optimization and allows unconstrained forward referencing. An unusual FASM construct is defining procedures only if they are used somewhere in the code, something that in most languages is done per-object by the linker.

FASM is based on the "same source, same output" principle: the contents of the resulting file are not affected by the command line. Such an approach saves FASM sources from compiling problems often present in many assembly projects. On the other hand, it makes it harder to maintain a project that consists of multiple separately compiled source files or mixed-language projects. However, there exists a Win32 wrapper called FA, which mitigates this problem. FASM projects can be built from one source file directly into an executable file without a linking stage.

== IDE ==
Fresh, a project started by John Found, is an integrated development environment for FASM under Windows and Linux.

== Use ==
Operating systems written with FASM:

- MenuetOS – 32- and 64-bit GUI operating systems by Ville Turijanmaa
- KolibriOS

Compilers that use FASM as a backend:

- PureBasic
- High Level Assembly (HLA)
- BlitzMax

== See also ==
- Comparison of assemblers
- List of assembly software and tools
