= Microsoft MACRO-80 =

Macro assembler for Intel 8080 and Zilog Z80 systems

- Developer(s): Microsoft
- Operating system: CP/M, ISIS-II, TRSDOS, TEKDOS, MSX-DOS
- Type: Macro assembler
- License: Commercial proprietary software

Microsoft MACRO-80 (often shortened to M80) is a relocatable macro assembler for Intel 8080 and Zilog Z80 microcomputer systems. The complete MACRO-80 package includes the MACRO-80 Assembler, the LINK-80 Linking Loader, and the CREF-80 Cross Reference Facility. The LIB-80 Library Manager is included in CP/M versions only. The list price at the time was $200.

== Overview ==
A MACRO-80 source program consists of a series of statements. Each statement must follow a predefined format. Source lines up to 132 characters in length are supported. M80 accepts source files almost identical to files for Intel-compatible assemblers. It also supports several switches in the command string. Some can be used to control the format of the source file. A switch can be set to allow support for Z80 mnemonics.

MACRO-80 runs on Digital Research CP/M, Intel ISIS-II, Tandy TRSDOS, Tektronix TEKDOS, and Microsoft MSX-DOS.

== See also ==
- Microsoft Macro Assembler
- Assembly language
- High-level assembler
- Comparison of assemblers
