= SASM (disambiguation) =

SASM may refer to:

== Science and technology ==
- SASM, an IDE for NASM assembly language

== Military ==
- Southwest Asia Service Medal, a military award of the United States Armed Forces

== Museums ==
- Strategic Air and Space Museum in Ashland, Nebraska
