= Randall Hyde =

American non-fiction author (born 1956)

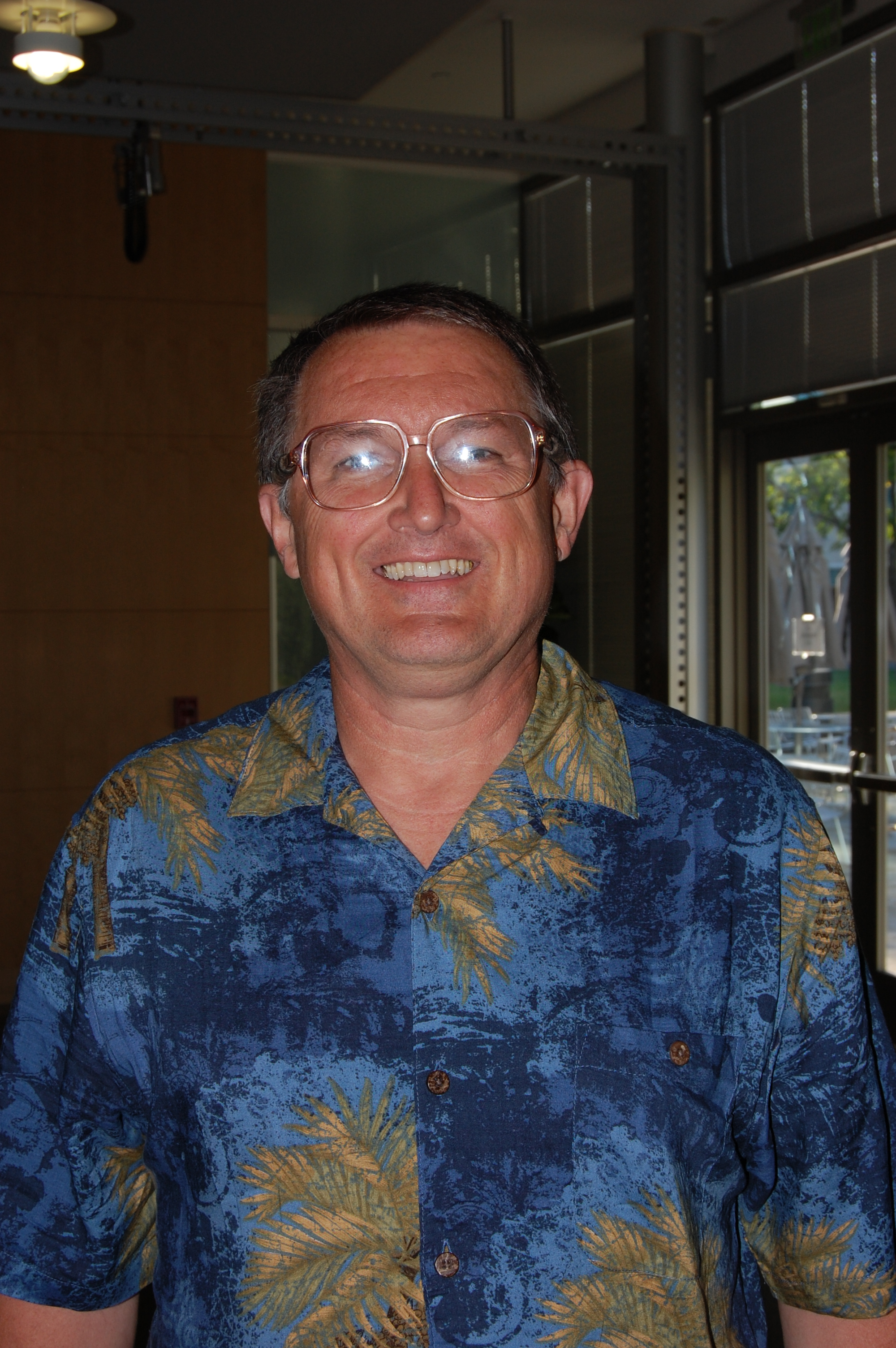
- Born: 1956 (age 69–70)
- Education: University of California, Riverside
- Writing career
- Genre: Non-fiction
- Subject: Technology
- Website: www.randallhyde.com

Randall Hyde (born 1956) is best known as the author of The Art of Assembly Language, a popular book on assembly language programming. He created the Lisa assembler in the late 1970s and developed the High Level Assembly (HLA) language.

== Biography ==
Hyde was educated, and later became a lecturer, at the University of California, Riverside. He earned a bachelor's degree in Computer Science in 1982, and a master's degree in Computer Science in 1987 - both from UC Riverside. His area of specialization is compilers and other system software, and he has written compilers, assemblers, operating systems and control software. He was a lecturer at California State Polytechnic University, Pomona from 1988 to 1993 and a lecturer at UC Riverside from 1989 to 2000. While teaching at UC Riverside and Cal Poly, Pomona, Randy frequently taught classes pertaining to assembly programming (beginning and advanced), software design, compilers, and programming language theory.

He was founder and president of Lazer Microsystems, which wrote the SmartBASIC interpreter and ADAM Calc for the Coleco Adam. According to Rich Drushel, the company also wrote the ADAM implementation of CP/M 2.2. He also wrote the 1983 Atari 2600 game Porky's while at Lazer, published by Fox Video Games.

Hyde has made many posts to the alt.lang.asm newsgroup in the past.

As of 2017, Hyde operates and is president of Plantation Productions, Inc., a Riverside, California corporation providing sound, lighting, staging, and event support services for small to medium-sized venues, for audiences of 10 to 5,000 people.

== Books ==
=== Modern books ===
- Hyde, Randall (September 2003). The Art of Assembly Language (1st ed.). San Francisco: No Starch Press. ISBN 978-1-886411-97-5. OL 8706071M.
- Hyde, Randall (October 25, 2004). Write Great Code: Volume 1 - Understanding the Machine (1st ed.). San Francisco: No Starch Press. ISBN 978-1-59327-003-2. OL 8871388M.
- Hyde, Randall (March 18, 2006). Write Great Code: Volume 2 - Thinking Low-Level, Writing High-Level (1st ed.). San Francisco: No Starch Press. ISBN 978-1-59327-065-0. OL 8871413M.
- Hyde, Randall (2010). The Art of Assembly Language (2nd ed.). San Francisco: No Starch Press. ISBN 978-1-59327-207-4. LCCN 2009040777. OCLC 419869059. OL 24814110M.
- Hyde, Randall (2020). Write Great Code: Volume 1 - Understanding the Machine (2nd ed.). San Francisco: No Starch Press. ISBN 978-1-7185-0036-5.
- Hyde, Randall (2020). Write Great Code: Volume 2 - Thinking Low-Level, Writing High-Level (2nd ed.). San Francisco: No Starch Press. ISBN 978-1-7185-0038-9.
- Hyde, Randall (2020). Write Great Code: Volume 3 - Engineering Software (1st ed.). San Francisco: No Starch Press. ISBN 978-1-5932-7979-0.
- Hyde, Randall (1992). The Waite Group's Microsoft Macro Assembler Bible (2nd ed.). Carmel, Indiana: SAMS. ISBN 978-0-672-30155-1. LCCN 92070084. OCLC 180644556.
- Hyde, Randall (October 2021). The Art of 64-Bit Assembly. San Francisco: No Starch Press. ISBN 9781718501089.

=== Early Apple programming books ===
- How to Program the Apple II Using 6502 Assembly Language (1981)
- p-Source (A Guide to the Apple Pascal System) (1983) ISBN 0881900044
