= TEST (x86 instruction) =

Instruction for x86 processors

In the x86 assembly language, the TEST instruction performs a bitwise AND on two operands. The flags SF, ZF, PF are modified while the numerical result of the AND is discarded. The OF and CF flags are set to 0, while AF flag is undefined. There are 9 different opcodes for the TEST instruction depending on the type and size of the operands. It can test 8-bit, 16-bit, 32-bit, or 64-bit values. It can also test registers and memory against registers and immediate values.

== TEST opcode variations ==
The TEST operation clears the flags CF and OF to zero. The SF is set to the most significant bit of the result of the AND. If the result is 0, the ZF is set to 1, otherwise set to 0. The parity flag is set to the bitwise XNOR of all eight least significant bits of the result, 1 if the number of ones in that byte is even, 0 otherwise. The value of AF is undefined.

== Examples ==
; Conditional Jump
test cl,cl   ; set ZF to 1 if cl == 0
jz 0x8004f430  ; jump if ZF == 1

; Conditional Jump with NOT
test cl, cl   ; set ZF to 1 if cl == 0
jnz 0x8004f430  ; jump if ZF == 0

; or
test eax, eax  ; set SF to 1 if eax < 0 (negative)
js error ; jump if SF == 1

; regular application
test al, $0F      ; set ZF if "al AND $0f = 0" (here: address-align test for 16b)
jnz @destination  ; jump if eax IS NOT "MODULO 16=0"

When ANDing a register against itself, there is no change to the register. The AND instruction could be substituted in most of these TEST examples.
