= Netwide Assembler =

Assembler for the Intel x86 architecture

NASM
- Original authors: Simon Tatham, Julian Hall
- Developers: H. Peter Anvin, Chang Seok Bae, Jim Kukunas, Frank B. Kotler, Cyrill Gorcunov
- Initial release: October 1996; 29 years ago
- Stable release: 3.01 / 11 October 2025; 7 months ago
- Written in: Assembly, C
- Operating system: Unix-like, Windows, OS/2, MS-DOS
- Available in: English
- Type: x86 assembler
- License: BSD 2-clause
- Website: nasm.us
- Repository: github.com/netwide-assembler/nasm

The Netwide Assembler (NASM) is an assembler and disassembler for the Intel x86 architecture. It can be used to write 16-bit, 32-bit (IA-32) and 64-bit (x86-64) programs. It is considered one of the most popular assemblers for Linux and x86 chips.

It was originally written by Simon Tatham with assistance from Julian Hall. As of 2016, it is maintained by a small team led by H. Peter Anvin. It is open-source software released under the terms of a simplified (2-clause) BSD license.

== Features ==
NASM can output several binary formats, including COFF, OMF, a.out, Executable and Linkable Format (ELF), Mach-O and binary file (.bin, binary disk image, used to compile operating systems), though position-independent code is supported only for ELF object files. It also has its own binary format called RDOFF.

The variety of output formats allows retargeting programs to virtually any x86 operating system (OS). It can also create flat binary files, usable to write boot loaders, read-only memory (ROM) images, and in various facets of OS development. It can run on non-x86 platforms (if NASM itself is compiled for that platform) as a cross assembler, such as PowerPC and SPARC, though it cannot generate programs usable by those machines.

NASM uses a variant of Intel assembly syntax instead of AT&T syntax. It also avoids features such as automatic generation of segment overrides (and the related ASSUME directive) used by MASM and compatible assemblers.

== Development ==
NASM version 0.90 was released in October 1996.

Version 2.00 was released on 28 November 2007, adding support for x86-64 extensions. The development versions are not uploaded to SourceForge.net, but are checked into GitHub with binary snapshots available from the project web page.

In July 2009, as of version 2.07, NASM was released under the Simplified (2-clause) BSD license. Previously, because it was licensed under LGPL, it led to development of Yasm, a complete rewrite of under the New BSD License. Yasm offered support for x86-64 earlier than NASM. It also added support for GNU Assembler syntax.

=== RDOFF ===
Relocatable Dynamic Object File Format (RDOFF) is used by developers to test the integrity of NASM's object file output abilities. It is based heavily on the internal structure of NASM, essentially consisting of a header containing a serialization of the output driver function calls followed by an array of sections containing executable code or data. Tools for using the format, including a linker and loader, are included in the NASM distribution.

Until version 0.90 was released in October 1996, NASM supported output of only flat-format executable files (e.g., COM files). In version 0.90, Simon Tatham added support for an object-file output interface, and for DOS .OBJ files for 16-bit code only.

NASM thus lacked a 32-bit object format. To address this lack, and as an exercise to learn the object-file interface, developer Julian Hall put together the first version of RDOFF, which was released in NASM version 0.91.

Since this initial version, there has been one major update to the RDOFF format, which added a record-length indicator on each header record, allowing programs to skip over records whose format they do not recognise, and support for multiple segments; RDOFF1 only supported three segments: text, data and bss (containing uninitialized data).

The RDOFF format is strongly deprecated and has been disabled starting in NASM 2.15.04.

== See also ==
- Assembly language
- Comparison of assemblers
- List of assembly software and tools
