= Microsoft Macro Assembler =

Assembler for Intel microprocessors

- Developer(s): Microsoft
- Initial release: 1981; 44 years ago
- Stable release: 14.16.27023.1 / March 7, 2017; 8 years ago
- Operating system: Microsoft Windows and MS-DOS
- Type: Assembler
- License: Commercial proprietary software
- Website: docs.microsoft.com/en-us/cpp/assembler/masm/microsoft-macro-assembler-reference

Microsoft Macro Assembler (MASM) is an x86 assembler that uses the Intel syntax for MS-DOS and Microsoft Windows. Beginning with MASM 8.0, there are two versions of the assembler: One for 16-bit & 32-bit assembly sources, and another (ML64) for 64-bit sources only.

MASM is maintained by Microsoft, but since version 6.12 it has not been sold as a separate product. It is instead supplied with various Microsoft SDKs and C compilers. Recent versions of MASM are included with Microsoft Visual Studio.

Notable applications compiled using MASM are RollerCoaster Tycoon which was 99% written in assembly language and built with MASM.

== History ==
The earliest versions of MASM date back to 1981. They were sold either as the generic "Microsoft Macro Assembler" for all x86 machines or as the OEM version specifically for IBM PCs. By Version 4.0, the IBM release was dropped. Up to Version 3.0, MASM was also bundled with a smaller companion assembler, ASM.EXE. This was intended for PCs with only 64k of memory and lacked some features of the full MASM, such as the ability to use code macros.

MS-DOS versions up to 4.x included Microsoft's LINK utility, which was designed to convert intermediate OBJ files generated by MASM and other compilers; however, as users who did not program had no use of the utility, it was moved to their compiler packages.

Version 4.0, released October 1985, added support for 286 instructions.

Version 5.0, released August 1987, supported 386 instructions, and also shorthand mnemonics for segment descriptors (.code, .data, etc.), but it could still only generate real mode executables.

Through version 5.0, MASM was available as an MS-DOS application only. Versions 5.1 and 6.0 were available as both MS-DOS and OS/2 applications.

Version 6.0, released in 1991, added parameter passing with "invoke" and some other high level-like constructs, in addition to the already existing high level-like records, among other things. Both 6.0 and 6.0B were able to be run on an 8086 processor but could generate flat 32-bit 386 code. In 1992, 6.1 was released, which added support for the COFF object format used by Windows NT, and removed support for OS/2. 6.1 was built as a bi-modal binary before the Win32 API was finalized, and is incompatible with running on Windows NT due to missing exports.

In 1993 full support for protected mode 32-bit applications and the Pentium instruction set was added. The 6.11 MASM binary at that time (1993) was shipped as a "bi-modal" (win32, i.e. PE) DOS-extended binary (using the Phar Lap TNT DOS extender). However, the setup.exe is an MZ executable so won't run under 64-bit versions of Windows, and the bi-modal ml.exe is compressed, and the decomp.exe is an NE executable, so also won't run under 64-bit versions of Windows, so you effectively need access to 32-bit Windows (or MSDOS) in order to install it. Version 6.11 is the last version of MASM that will run under MS-DOS. There were a series of patches available, up to 6.11d, that need 32-bit Windows to run, but the patched ml.exe still has the Phar Lap dos extender so can still be run under MSDOS.

By the end of 1997, MASM fully supported Windows 95 and included some AMD-specific instructions.

In 1999, Intel released macros for SIMD and MMX instructions, which were shortly thereafter supported natively by MASM. With the 6.15 release in 2000, Microsoft discontinued support for MASM as a separate product, instead subsuming it into the Visual Studio toolset. Though it was still compatible with Windows 98, current versions of Visual Studio were not. Support for 64-bit processors was not added until the release of Visual Studio 2005, with MASM 8.0.

After 25 June 2015, there are at least three different MASMs with the version number 14.00.23026. In Microsoft Visual Studio 2015 Enterprise Edition, there is one "amd64_x86" ml and two ml64s, "x86_amd64" and "amd64". They run on different platforms targeting different platforms:

- amd64_x86: generates 64-bit code, runs in a Windows 32-bit environment
- x86_amd64: generates 32-bit code, runs in a Windows 64-bit environment
- amd64: generates 64-bit code, runs in a Windows 64-bit environment

== Object module formats supported by MASM ==
Early versions of MASM generated object modules using the OMF format, which was used to create binaries for MS-DOS or OS/2.

Since version 6.1, MASM is able to produce object modules in the Portable Executable (PE/COFF) format. PE/COFF is compatible with recent Microsoft C compilers, and object modules produced by either MASM or the C compiler can be routinely intermixed and linked into Win32 and Win64 binaries.

== Assemblers compatible with MASM ==
Some other assemblers can assemble most code written for MASM, with the exception of more complex macros.

- Turbo Assembler (TASM) developed by Borland, later owned by Embarcadero, last updated in 2002, but still supplied with C++Builder and RAD Studio.
- JWasm Macro Assembler, licensed under the Sybase Open Watcom EULA. Last updated in 2014.
- Pelle's Macro Assembler, a component of the Pelles C development environment.
- UASM is a free MASM-compatible assembler based on JWasm.
- ASMC is a free MASM-compatible assembler based on JWasm.

== Mixed language programming support ==
Documentation for 1987's version 5.1 included support for "Microsoft BASIC, C, FORTRAN, Pascal."

== Reception ==
In a review of three assemblers, Michael Blaszczak of BYTE in February 1989 found that MASM 5.1 was the slowest and complained the most about code. He concluded that "MASM takes some getting used to, but it gets the job done" despite "more than its fair share of frustrating quirks and oddities".

== See also ==
- Microsoft MACRO-80
- Assembly language
- High-level assembler
- Comparison of assemblers
