= GNU Assembler =

Free and open-source assembler

- Developer: GNU Project
- Release: 1986; 40 years ago
- Stable release: GNU Binutils 2.47 / 26 July 2026; 31 days ago
- Written in: C
- Platform: Cross-platform
- Type: Assembler
- License: GNU General Public License v3
- Website: www.gnu.org/software/binutils/

The GNU Assembler, commonly known as gas or as, is the assembler developed by the GNU Project. It is the default final pass of GCC, generating machine code from the assembly-language output of the code generator. It is used to assemble the assembly-language portions of the GNU operating system and the Linux kernel, and various other software. It is a part of the GNU Binutils package.

The GAS executable is named as, the standard name for a Unix assembler. GAS is cross-platform, and both runs on and assembles for a number of different computer architectures. GAS is free software released under the GNU General Public License v3.

== History ==
The first version of GAS was released in 1986–1987. It was written by Dean Elsner and supported the VAX architecture.

== General syntax ==
GAS supports a general syntax that works for all of the supported architectures. The general syntax includes assembler directives and a method for commenting. The default syntax is AT&T syntax.

=== Directives ===
GAS uses assembler directives (also known as pseudo ops), which are keywords beginning with a period that behave similarly to preprocessor directives in the C programming language. While most of the available assembler directives are valid regardless of the target architecture, some directives are machine dependent.

Since version 2.10, Intel syntax can be used through use of the .intel_syntax directive.

=== Comments ===
GAS supports two comment styles.

Multi-line

As in C, multi-line comments start and end with mirroring slash-asterisk pairs:

/* 
comment
*/

Single-line

Single line comments have a few different formats varying on which architecture is being assembled for.

- A hash symbol (#) — i386, x86-64, i960, 68HC11, 68HC12, VAX, V850, M32R, PowerPC, MIPS, M680x0, and RISC-V
- A semicolon (;) — AMD 29k family, ARC, H8/300 family, HPPA, PDP-11, picoJava, Motorola, and M32C
- The at sign (@) — 32-bit ARM
- A double slash (//) — AArch64
- A vertical bar (|) — M680x0
- An exclamation mark (!) — Renesas SH

== Usage ==
Being the final stage for a popular compiler suite, namely GCC, the GNU Assembler is very widely used in compiling modern free and open source software. GAS is often used as the assembler on Linux operating systems in conjunction with other GNU software. A modified version of GAS can also be found in the macOS development tools package.

== Example program ==
A standard "Hello, world!" program for Linux on IA-32:

.global	_start

.text
_start:
	movl  $4, %eax   # 4 (code for "write" syscall) -> EAX register
	movl  $1, %ebx   # 1 (file descriptor for stdout) -> EBX (1st argument to syscall)
	movl  $msg, %ecx # 32-bit address of msg string -> ECX (2nd argument)
	movl  $len, %edx # length of msg string -> EDX (3rd arg)
	int   $0x80      # interrupt with location 0x80 (128), which invokes the kernel's system call procedure

	movl  $1, %eax   # 1 ("exit") -> EAX
	movl  $0, %ebx   # 0 (with success) -> EBX
	int   $0x80      # see previous
.data
msg:
	.ascii  "Hello, world!\n" # inline ascii string
	len =   . - msg           # assign (current address - address of msg start) to symbol "len"

== See also ==
- GNU toolchain
- Binary File Descriptor library
- Comparison of assemblers
- List of assembly software and tools
