= P-Code (disambiguation) =

P-code is an alternative term for bytecode, machine-independent code that achieves independence by targeting a p-code machine, a virtual machine designed for running p-code rather than the intention to emulate any specific hardware architecture.

P-code may also refer to:

== Computing ==
- Microsoft P-Code, an alternative binary format for Microsoft Windows libraries and applications
- P-code, obfuscated code in MATLAB
- P-code, the intermediate representation of the PL/SQL compiler, also known as m-code
- P-code, UCSD Pascal system bytecode, executed by a P-code machine

== Other uses ==
- Precision code, used in the Global Positioning System
- P-codes, engine diagnostic codes; See Table of OBD-II Codes
- Place code, an address system used by emergency response teams
