= PForth =

pForth
- Original author: Phil Burk
- Developer: Phil Burk
- Stable release: 2.0.1 / 9 January 2023; 3 years ago
- Written in: C
- Operating system: Linux, Mac OS, Windows, WebTV, and embedded systems with no operating system
- Size: 204 KB
- Available in: English, French, Chinese
- Type: Programming language
- License: BSD Zero Clause License
- Website: www.softsynth.com/pforth/
- Repository: github.com/philburk/pforth

pForth (Portable Forth) is a portable implementation of the Forth programming language written in ANSI C. It differs from the other distributions of Forth in that it strives for portability over performance. pForth is released under the BSD Zero Clause License.

== History ==
PForth started out as HForth, which was used in connection with the Hierarchical Music Specification Language, a music experimentation language developed by Phil Burk, Larry Polansky and David Rosenboom. Phil Burk ported the HForth kernel to C when he moved to the 3DO company. The newly ported Forth at 3DO had to run on many different systems including SUN, SGI, Macintosh, IBM PC compatibles, Amiga, and the 3DO ARM based Opera system.

== License ==
Originally pForth was released to the public domain with a custom release and disclaimer of no warranty but in 2020, it was relicensed under the zero-clause BSD license, which is a public-domain-equivalent license.
