= ColorForth =

Programming language

colorForth
- Paradigm: Procedural, stack-oriented
- Designed by: Charles H. Moore
- Developer: Charles H. Moore
- First appeared: 1990s
- Stable release: July 31, 2001; 24 years ago
- Typing discipline: Typeless
- License: Public domain
- Website: Archived at colorforth.github.io

Influenced by
- Forth

colorForth is a programming language from the Forth language's creator, Charles H. Moore, developed in the 1990s. The language combines elements of Moore's earlier Forth systems and adds color as a way of indicating how words should be interpreted. Program text is tokenized as it is entered, moving some of the work of compilation to the editor.

== History ==
Moore developed Forth in the early 1970s and created multiple implementations of the language. In the 1980s he diverged from the standardization of the language, instead continuing to evolve it. He developed a series of Forth-like languages, each extreme in its simplicity: Machine Forth, OKAD, and colorForth.

colorForth was originally developed as the scripting language for Moore's own VLSI CAD program, OKAD, with which he develops custom Forth processors. As the language gained utility, he rewrote his CAD program in it, spruced up the environment, and released it to the public. It has since gained a small following, spurred much debate in the Forth community, and sprung offshoots for other processors and operating environments. The language's roots are closer to the Forth machine languages Moore develops for his processors than to the mainstream standardized Forths in more widespread use.

Moore's personal implementation of the language for IBM PC compatibles comes with its own tiny (63 KB) operating system. Practically everything is stored as source code and compiled when needed. The current colorForth environment is limited to running on Pentium-grade PCs with limited support for lowest-common-denominator motherboards, AGP video, disk, and network hardware.

== Language ==
The colors of program code in colorForth have semantic meaning. Red words start a definition, and green words are compiled into the current definition. Thus, colorForth would be written in standard Forth as

: color forth ;

Yellow words are executed. The transition from green to yellow and back again can be used while defining words, to transition between compiling words into the current definition, executing words immediately (manipulating the data stack during compilation), and back again (adding the top of the data stack to the current definition) – in other words, precomputing a value during compilation (a functionality that other languages use macros or optimizing compilers for).

Moore has stated that color is only one option for displaying the language. One of Moore's papers on colorForth was printed in black and white but used italics and other typographical conventions to present source code.
