= Elizabeth Rather =

American computer scientist

Elizabeth D. Rather
- Born: 1940 (age 85–86)
- Other name: Bess Rather
- Occupations: Entrepreneur; Programmer
- Known for: FORTH, Inc. co-founder Forth programming language expertise

Elizabeth "Bess" D. Rather (born 1940) is the co-founder of FORTH, Inc. and is a leading expert in the Forth programming language.

She became involved with Forth while she was at the University of Arizona, but working part-time for National Radio Astronomy Observatory (NRAO). While she initially aimed to rewrite their systems (written in Forth) in FORTRAN, her discovery of the power of Forth convinced her to leave the University to work for NRAO and Kitt Peak National Observatory, where she wrote the first Forth manual and started popularizing the language in the scientific community. She co-founded FORTH, Inc. with Charles Moore in 1973. Since then, she has become an expert in the language and one of its main proponents. She is an author of several books on the subject and has given many training seminars on its usage.

From 1980 to 2006 she was President of FORTH, Inc., headquartered in the Los Angeles area. From 1986 to 1994, she was chair of the Technical Committee X3J14 that developed the ANSI Standard (X3.215-1994) for the Forth programming language.

In 2006, she retired and lives in Hawaii, but continues with occasional Forth-related writing and teaching projects.

== Publications ==
- Conklin, Edward K.; Elizabeth D. Rather; et al. (8 September 2007) [First edition September 1997]. Forth Programmer's Handbook (paperback). Forth Inc. ISBN 1-4196754-9-4.
- Rather, Elizabeth D. (10 June 2019) [First edition 2008]. Forth Application Techniques (paperback). Forth Inc. ISBN 1-0950757-9-9.
