= Gforth =

Free implementation of the Forth programming language

- Original authors: Bernd Paysan; Anton Ertl
- Developer: GNU Project
- Release: mid-1992; 34 years ago
- Stable release: 0.7.9_20250101 / 1 January 2025; 21 months ago
- Written in: C, Forth
- Operating system: Unix-like, Windows, MS-DOS, OS/2
- Type: Interpreter
- License: GNU GPLv3
- Website: gforth.org
- Repository: git.savannah.gnu.org/cgit/gforth.git

Gforth is a free and portable implementation of the Forth programming language for Unix-like systems, Microsoft Windows, and other operating systems. A primary goal of Gforth is to adhere to the ANS Forth standard. Gforth is free software as part of the GNU Project.

== History ==
The Gforth project was started in mid-1992 by Bernd Paysan and Anton Ertl. Gforth descends from bigFORTH and fig-Forth Gforth is fully ANS FORTH compliant.
