= Elliot 900 =

Family of small computers primarily used for aviation and education

Elliott 900 Series
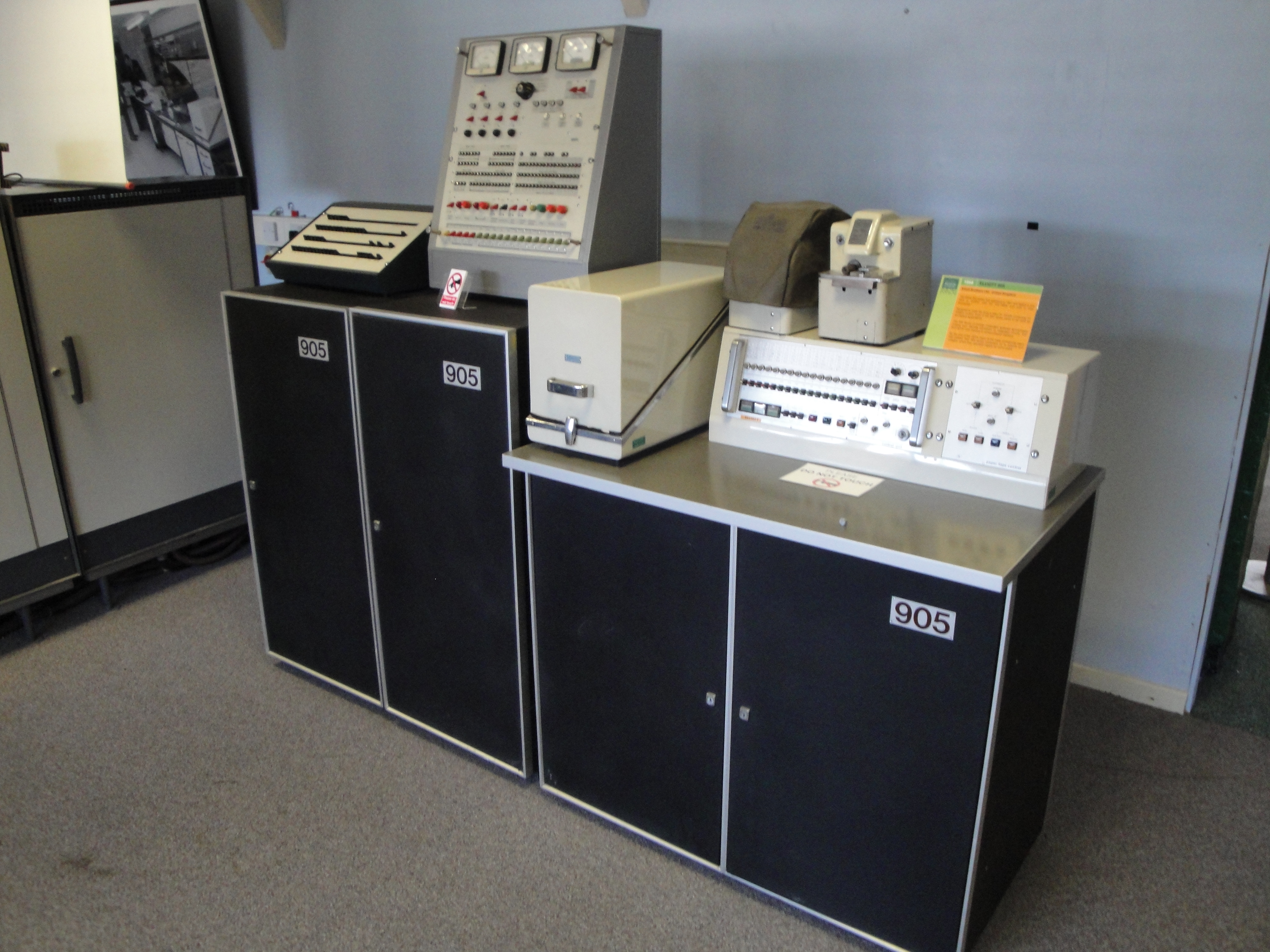
- Elliott 905 in The National Museum of Computing
- Developer: Elliott Brothers
- Product family: 900 Series
- Type: Minicomputer
- Released: 1961; 65 years ago
- Discontinued: yes
- Units shipped: ~1000
- Platform: 18-bit

The Elliott 900 series was a family of small computers built by Elliott Brothers of the United Kingdom. The first model was the 1961 Elliott 901, an 18-bit computer for industrial control and small business use. This was ruggedized to produce 1962's 920A as the navigation computer for the Hawker Siddeley Nimrod. This compact version won many additional sales, including a British Army artillery computer, navigation on the SEPECAT Jaguar, and the engine control and guidance of the Europa space launcher.

The machines were updated through the 1960s and 70s, following improvements in semiconductor fabrication and core memory. The first 901/920A was quickly replaced in 1963 by the faster 903/920B which formed the majority of early production. The move to integrated circuits produced the 920M for "micro-miniature", and then the faster 905/920C. By this time, new 16-bit entrants in the minicomputer space had rendered 18-bit platforms outmoded in the business market, and further development was mostly on the 920 series. 903s gained a second life when they were passed down to secondary schools.

Many of the military 920s were still in use in the early 1980s, by which time the components were no longer made. This led to the last members of the series, the 920ME and 920ATC, which re-implemented the original design using large scale integration off-the-shelf parts, with the processor logic implemented in five 4-bit AMD Am2900 bit slice processors and the memory in DRAM and EPROM. It was packaged to fit into the same 3/4 ATR case case so it could be drop-in replaced, and deliberately run much slower than it was capable of to remain completely compatible.

The same basic design was also used in several 13- and 12-bit machines, starting with the 902 of 1969. The avionic 12/12 followed in 1973, and the PEC in 1982. Versions of the 18-bit systems intended for industrial settings were known as the Arch 900.

== Description ==
=== Logic design ===
The 900 series used an 18-bit word length and a 13-bit address. Machines initially shipped with 4 or 8 kW (9 or 18 kB), but is not clear whether any systems ever shipped with the 4 k modules. Later models, like the 905, allowed multiple 8 or 16 kW modules to support up to 128 kW.

There were five processor registers in total, the accumulator (Acc), auxiliary register (AR), a memory offset register B (for base), the sequence control register (SRC, the program counter) and a status register. The SCR and B registers were duplicated for each of four interrupt levels, making it easier to build interrupt handlers. The SCR and B registers were stored in main memory, as was common in the era when memory ran as fast as the CPU.

Instructions were encoded with bits 1 to 13 indicating an address N, and bits 14 through 17 a four-bit instruction F (for Function) that allowed for a total of sixteen instructions. The final bit, 18, B but known as the "modifier", indicated that the address in the instruction should be modified by the addition of the value in the appropriate B register. This allowed programs to access data or instructions that were within 18 bits of the B value.

The instructions included Load B, Add, Negate and Add (thus performing subtract), Read and Write a value to memory, Collate, Jump, Jump if Zero, Jump if Negative, Multiply, Divide, (bit) Shift, and Input/Output. Instructions 14 and 15 were extended, using some bits in the N field indicating further instruction - in the case of Shift it was the number of places to shift the value, possibly negative, and for the I/O instruction the most significant bit indicated if it was a read or write, and the rest indicated a device number. The system was designed from the start to be programmed primarily using punch tape. It used 8-hole tape with the 5th digit used as a parity bit, leaving 7 bits of data. A single word was stored as three entries on the tape.

Two internal numeric forms were supported, an integer with 17 bits of data and the most significant bit as the sign bit indicating positive or negative, and a fixed-point fraction with a sign bit and 17 digits of fraction. This format could hold values from -1 to +1-2^{17}. Negative fractions were stored in two's complement form. When used to store character data, three characters were stored as 6-bit values but could be translated to an ASCII-like format they referred to as telecode.

=== Loader ===
Core memory is non-volatile and retains its values even when powered off. Commercial systems normally shipped with a loader program loaded into addresses 8180 through 8191. This meant the machine could be started up, that address entered on the front panel, and then set to run mode to load a program from the tape.

=== Physical construction ===
The construction of the 900 family changed over time. The following description is based on the 1970s-era 920M. The 920M was about the size of a breadbox. It consisted of three sections connected together with hinges that allowed them to be opened in fanfold fashion for maintenance. Mylar ribbon cables supplied power and signals between the sections.

One of the three leaves, somewhat thicker than the other two, contained the 147,456-bit core memory distributed across 7 printed circuit boards with cores on either side of the boards. The boards were stacked and encased in an aluminium box. This was positioned in the centre of the leaf, with room for 36 "modules" on either side. These modules handled reading and writing to core and similar non-logic tasks. The modules consisted of several individual electrical components like resistors and capacitors welded to a thin mylar printed circuit boards. Two such boards were then arranged with the mylar on the outside and the components between, and then the resulting assembly was potted in epoxy. The result was a solid rectangle about the size of a thumb with 18 electrical pins sticking out one end.

The computer logic was contained in the other two leaves of the fanfold. This consisted of 450 modules of 38 different types. These were constructed in a fashion similar to the I/O units, but much smaller and with the mylar PCB only on one side. The modules could contain any needed components, with the primary logic being implemented in small DTL integrated circuits with up to three ICs per module. The 38 types were colour-coded on the exposed edge and plugged into another PCB that formed the backplane. The connections between the modules were accomplished by 20 additional large-sized mylar PCBs stacked and then connected using wire wrap, the pins of which formed the connections between the two leaves of logic when the unit was folded shut.
