= Microassembler =

A microassembler is a computer program that helps prepare a microprogram, called firmware, to control the low level operation of a computer in much the same way an assembler helps prepare higher level code for a processor. The difference is that the microprogram is usually only developed by the processor manufacturer and works intimately with the computer hardware. On a microprogrammed computer the microprogram implements the operations of the instruction set in which any normal program (including both application programs and operating systems) is written. The use of a microprogram allows the manufacturer to fix certain mistakes, including working around hardware design errors, without modifying the hardware. Another means of employing microassembler-generated microprograms is in allowing the same hardware to run different instruction sets. After it is assembled, the microprogram is then loaded to a control store to become part of the logic of a CPU's control unit.

Some microassemblers are more generalized and are not targeted at a single computer architecture. For example, through the use of macro-assembler-like capabilities, Digital Equipment Corporation used their MICRO2 microassembler for a very wide range of computer architectures and implementations.

If a given computer implementation supports a writeable control store, the microassembler is usually provided to customers as a means of writing customized microcode.

In the process of microcode assembly it is helpful to verify the microprogram with emulation tools before distribution. Nowadays, microcoding has experienced a revival, since it is possible to correct and optimize the firmware of processing units already manufactured or sold, in order to adapt to specific operating systems or to fix hardware bugs. However, a commonly usable microassembler for today's CPUs is not available to manipulate the microcode. Knowledge of a processor's microcode is usually considered proprietary information so it is difficult to obtain information about how to modify it.
