= Millicode =

Higher level of microcode

In computer architecture, millicode is a higher level of microcode used to implement part of the instruction set of a computer.

== Overview ==
The instruction set for millicode is a subset of the machine's native instruction set, omitting those instructions that are implemented using millicode, plus instructions that provide access to hardware not accessible using the native instruction set. Millicode routines are used to implement more complex instructions visible to the user of the system. Implementation of millicode may require a special processor mode called millimode that provides its own set of registers, and possibly its own special instructions invisible to the user.

The term millicode was introduced to literature by Klingman in 1981, although terms like nanocode had been in use since the early 1970's when describing computer architectures with hierarchical implementations of instructions. Various computers have used millicode in their designs, such as the System/390 9672-G4 processor. The following are cited as advantages of millicode:

- More complex instructions can easily be constructed from several millicode instructions.
- Construction of a compatible line of computer models with different performance is simplified.
- Millicode instructions can bypass CPU cache to improve performance.
- Instructions can update multiple storage locations without concern for being interrupted.
- Millicode can execute instructions at a higher privilege level without involving the operating system.
- Millicode can provide a complex instruction as if it were a subroutine, making user code smaller.

The "i370" code for the "Capitol" chipset used in some ES/9370 models was similar to millicode, in that it was written as a combination of System/370 instructions and code that had access to special hardware features.

== See also ==
- PALcode
