= List of emulators =

This article lists software emulators.

== Central processing units ==
=== ARM ===
- ARMulator
- Aemulor
- QEMU

=== MIPS ===
- SPIM: The OVPsim 500 mips MIPS32 emulator, can be used to develop software using virtual platforms, emulators including MIPS processors running at up to 500 MIPS, the processor is capable of running many OSes including Linux. OVP is used to build emulators of single MIPS processors or multiple - homogeneous MP or heterogenous MP.

=== x86 architecture ===
- Bochs
- DOSBox
- FX!32
- PCem
- QEMU – an opensource emulator that emulates 7 architectures including ARM, x86, MIPS, and others
- box86
- Rosetta 2: Apple's emulator for macOS allowing to run x86_64 applications on the ARM-based Apple silicon family of chips

=== Motorola 680x0 ===
- Mac 68k emulator: For PowerPC classic Mac OS

=== PowerPC ===
- PearPC
- Rosetta: Apple's emulator for PowerPC processors, built into Mac OS X
- WarpUP: Amiga system for PowerPC expansion cards built into MorphOS and available for AmigaOS

=== RISC-V ===
- QEMU

== Full system simulators ==
- Simics
- CPU Sim: A Java application that allows the user to design and create a simple architecture and instruction set and then run programs of instructions from the set through simulation
- GXemul: Framework for full-system computer architecture emulation

== Mobile phones and PDAs ==
- Adobe Device Central
- BlueStacks
- NoxPlayer
- Palm OS Emulator
- touchHLE
- Windows Subsystem for Android

== Multi-system emulators ==
- blueMSX: Emulates Z80 based computers and consoles
- MAME: Emulates multiple arcade machines, video game consoles and computers
- DAPHNE is an arcade emulator application that emulates a variety of laserdisc video games with the intent of preserving these games and making the play experience as faithful to the originals as possible. The developer calls DAPHNE the "First Ever Multiple Arcade Laserdisc Emulator" ("FEMALE"). It derives its name from Princess Daphne, the heroine of Dragon's Lair. HYPSEUS is a modern SDL2 update to the DAPHNE emulator, named after a sibling to Daphne.
- DEXTER is a hardware-based implementation of DAPHNE's LaserDisc player emulation created by its original developer. Named after the protagonist of Space Ace, it allows owners of original arcade machines to replace a variety of LaserDisc players with a solid-state digital video system that emulates the functions and playback quality of a given player as they were when it was first manufactured. (Note: Like most electromechanical playback devices, LaserDisc players often lose some of their speed and efficiency as their components age. However, due to the non-linear nature of the format, this aging typically introduces extra delays that game programmers may not have accounted for.) For compatibility and authenticity purposes, this emulation reproduces most of the LaserDisc format's flaws, such as the screen momentarily going blank when the game seeks to another part of the "disc".

== Network emulators ==
- ns-2
- Cisco Packet Tracer
- Router Sim

== Operating system emulators ==
=== Unix ===
- Cygwin: For Microsoft Windows, provides a POSIX environment and system libraries (contained in cygwin.dll). This does not allow running unaltered Unix or Linux binary files (binaries). However, it allows use of the GNU compiler collection (gcc) to compile software written for these operating systems from source code.

In addition to the POSIX system, Cygwin includes a package manager that connects to a repository with 9000+ software packages. Users can optionally use Cygwin ports repository which includes >2300 (86x64) to >2700 (86x32) more software packages not included in the RedHat-hosted repository, including many graphical user interface (GUI) applications.

The repository contains a wide range of software, including Bash (command shell and scripting environment comparable to the Windows PowerShell), the GNU compiler collection with the complete tool chain. Further, the 'usual and customary' programming languages installed with a Linux distribution, including C, C++, Python, PHP, Perl, Tcl/Tk, and Lua are available, along with multiple development libraries.

In addition to Bash, the GNU Utilities (e.g., find utilities, such as locate, find, grep) are installed by default. Hundreds of other software packages are included, many with non-POSIX Windows implementation, such as database management systems (PostgreSQL, MySQL), web servers (e.g., Apache HTTP Server), firewalls, text processing utilities, and console mode applications. Further, a (reasonably stable) X.Org Server X Window System (X11) implementation exists with GTK and Qt libraries. Based on these, graphic desktop managers, including GNOME, LXDE, LXQt, KDE, and others (e.g., x2go) with associated graphic user applications with variable stability and function.

=== Windows ===
- Wine: Available for most POSIX compliant (Unix-like) operating systems, such as Linux, Berkeley Software Distribution (BSD), and macOS (Darling and Darwine projects). It provides a Win32 API and cleanroom implementation of the associated functions. In contrast to Cygwin, Wine enables the installation and use of unaltered Windows software. Considerable effort has been put into support for video games, including third-party extensions (e.g., PlayOnLinux) which provide custom Windows configurations known to work with a very large list of video games. Further, office productivity software, including Microsoft Office, is supported. Because of the lack of dependence on the Windows registry, inclusion of statically linked libraries, and (at least in part) historic development from open source projects, portable application, such as the PortableApps platform and the 300+ available software applications which can be downloaded with it, work with little or no issues.

== Printer emulators ==
- Ghostscript: Emulator for printers without PostScript

== See also ==
- Comparison of application virtual machines
- Comparison of OS emulation or virtualization apps on Android
- Comparison of platform virtualization software
- List of compatibility layers
- List of free and open-source emulators for Android
- List of video game console emulators
