= Virtutech =

Swedish-American software company (1998–2010), acquired by Intel

- Type: Corporation
- Industry: Software
- Founded: 1998; 28 years ago in Stockholm, Sweden
- Founders: Magnus Christensson, Fredrik Larsson, Peter S. Magnusson, Andreas Moestedt, Bengt Werner
- Defunct: February 5, 2010; 16 years ago
- Fate: Acquired by Intel; Simics product line placed in Wind River Systems
- Headquarters: San Jose, California
- Key people: Peter S. Magnusson (CEO 1998–2005); John Lambert (CEO 2005–2010)
- Products: Simics
- Number of employees: 55 at peak
- Website: www.virtutech.com

Virtutech was a software company founded in 1998 in Stockholm as a spin-off from the Swedish Institute of Computer Science (SICS) to develop the institute's Simics full-system simulator commercially. Later headquartered in San Jose, California, it was acquired by Intel in 2010, and Simics has since been developed by Intel and sold by Wind River Systems.

== History ==
Virtutech was founded in 1998 by the five members of the SICS simulation group, Magnus Christensson, Fredrik Larsson, Peter S. Magnusson, Andreas Moestedt and Bengt Werner, as the first spin-off company in the institute's history; SICS licensed the simulator's development and exploitation rights to the company, which opened in the summer of 1998 with Magnusson as chief executive. Early customers included Sun Microsystems, Ericsson and Hewlett-Packard.

In January 2001, AMD licensed Simics as "VirtuHammer", a simulator for its forthcoming x86-64 processors that it supplied to operating-system developers more than two years before the first Opteron shipped. In May 2005, John Lambert succeeded Magnusson as chief executive; Magnusson became chief technology officer and remained on the board. In July 2005, IBM selected Simics for development of its POWER6 platform, and Wind River Systems became a customer in 2006. In 2007, Virtutech and Freescale announced a collaboration program around multicore processors. By 2006 the majority of the company's revenue came from embedded systems.

In 2004 the company took outside investment and moved its headquarters to San Jose, California. Virtutech was a member of Power.org.

On February 5, 2010, Intel announced that it had agreed to acquire Virtutech and that Simics would be maintained by Intel's subsidiary Wind River Systems. The price of the acquisition was reported as $45 million. Intel sold Wind River to TPG Capital in 2018, and TPG sold it to Aptiv in 2022; Wind River continues to sell Simics, which Intel has also offered as a free public release since 2021.
