= Path length =

Path length can refer to:

== Physics ==
- Travel path length, the total distance an object travels dependent on its path through space
- Optical path length, the product of the distance light travels and the refractive index of the medium it travels through
- Mean free path, the average distance that a particle travels before scattering
- Radiation length, a characteristic length for the decay of radiation in a medium

== Networks and computing ==
- Average path length, the average number of steps along the shortest paths for all possible pairs of network nodes
- Hop count, the number of intermediate network devices through which data must pass between source and destination in a computer network
- Instruction path length, the number of machine code instructions required to execute a section of a computer program
