= Peter S. Magnusson =

Swedish computer scientist and technology executive

- Education: KTH Royal Institute of Technology; Stockholm School of Economics
- Occupations: Computer scientist, technology executive
- Known for: Simics, Virtutech, partial translation
- Awards: ACM Fellow (2011)

Peter S. Magnusson is a Swedish computer scientist and technology executive. He is the original developer of the Simics full-system simulator, which he began writing at the Swedish Institute of Computer Science (SICS) in 1991, and the author of the 1993 SICS technical report Partial Translation, which describes a technique for generating native code at run time within an interpreter. In 2015 the United States Court of Appeals for the Federal Circuit held that the report anticipated claims of a Sun Microsystems patent on Java virtual machine execution that was asserted in Oracle America, Inc. v. Google, Inc..

In 1998 Magnusson co-founded Virtutech, the first spin-off company from SICS, to commercialize Simics, and served as its chief executive. Virtutech was acquired by Intel in 2010. Simics remains in commercial use; it is developed by Intel, which has offered a free public release since 2021, and sold by Wind River Systems.

Magnusson was an engineering director at Google from 2010 to 2014, where he led several Google Cloud Platform products, including Google App Engine. He was vice president of engineering at Snapchat from February to July 2014, and senior vice president of cloud development at Oracle from October 2014. The Oracle Public Cloud engineering organization he headed took in the engineering team of the OpenStack startup Nebula after it closed in 2015, and the staff of Ravello Systems after Oracle acquired that company in 2016.

Magnusson holds an MS in computer science from the KTH Royal Institute of Technology and an MBA from the Stockholm School of Economics. He was elected a Fellow of the Association for Computing Machinery in 2011 "for contributions to full-system simulation".

== Selected publications ==
- Magnusson, Peter S.; Christensson, Magnus; Eskilson, Jesper; Forsgren, Daniel; Hållberg, Gustav; Högberg, Johan; Larsson, Fredrik; Moestedt, Andreas; Werner, Bengt (February 2002). "Simics: A Full System Simulation Platform". Computer. 35 (2): 50–58. doi:10.1109/2.982916.
- Magnusson, Peter S.; Larsson, Fredrik; Moestedt, Andreas; Werner, Bengt; Nilsson, Jim; Stenström, Per; Lundholm, Fredrik; Karlsson, Magnus; Dahlgren, Fredrik; Grahn, Håkan (1998). SimICS/sun4m: A Virtual Workstation. USENIX Annual Technical Conference.
- Magnusson, Peter (20 October 2004). "Full System Simulation: Software Development's Missing Link". Computerworld.
- Magnusson, Peter S. (May 2005). "The Virtual Test Lab". Computer. 38 (5): 95–97. doi:10.1109/MC.2005.174.
