= ARMulator =

ARM Instruction Set Simulator, also known as ARMulator, is one of the software development tools provided by the development systems business unit of ARM Limited to all users of ARM-based chips. It owes its heritage to the early development of the instruction set by Sophie Wilson. Part of this heritage is still visible in the provision of a Tube BBC Micro model in ARMulator.

== Features ==
ARMulator is written in C and provides more than just an instruction set simulator, it provides a virtual platform for system emulation. It comes ready to emulate an ARM processor and certain ARM coprocessors. If the processor is part of an embedded system, then licensees may extend ARMulator to add their own implementations of the additional hardware to the ARMulator model. ARMulator provides a number of services to help with the time-based behaviour and event scheduling and ships with examples of memory mapped and co-processor expansions. This way, they can use ARMulator to emulate their entire embedded system. A key limitation for ARMulator is that it can only simulate a single ARM CPU at one time, although almost all ARM cores up to ARM11 are available.

Performance of ARMulator is good for the technology employed, it's about 1000 host (PC) instructions per ARM instruction. This means that emulated speeds of 1 MHz were normal for PCs of the mid to late 90s. Accuracy is good too, although it is classed as cycle count accurate rather than cycle accurate, this is because the ARM pipeline isn't fully modeled (although register interlocks are). Resolution is to an instruction, as a consequence when single stepping the register interlocks are ignored and different cycle counts are returned than if the program had simply run, this was unavoidable.

The ARM architecture validation suites can be used to test ARMulator.

ARMulator allows runtime debugging using either armsd (ARM Symbolic Debugger), or either of the graphical debuggers that were shipped in SDT and the later ADS products. ARMulator suffered from being an invisible tool with a text file configuration (armul.conf) that many found complex to configure.

ARMulator II formed the basis for the high accuracy, cycle callable co-verification models of ARM processors, these CoVs models (see Cycle Accurate Simulator) were the basis of many CoVerification systems for ARM processors.

== Availability ==
ARMulator was available on a very broad range of platforms through its life, including Mac, RISC OS platforms, DEC Alpha, HP-UX, Solaris, SunOS, Windows, Linux. In the mid-1990s there was reluctance to support Windows platforms; pre-Windows 95 it was a relatively challenging platform. Through the late 1990s and early 2000s support was removed for all but Solaris, Windows and Linux - although undoubtedly the code base remains littered with pragmas such as #ifdef RISCOS.

ARMulator II shipped in early ARM toolkits as well as the later SDT 2.5, SDT 2.5.1, ADS 1.0, ADS 1.1, ADS 1.2, RCVT 1.0 and also separately as RVISS. Special models were produced during the development of CPUs, notably the ARM9E, ARM10 and ARM11, these models helped with architectural decisions such as Thumb-2 and TrustZone.

ARMulator has been gradually phased out and has been replaced by Just-in-time compilation-based high performance CPU and system models (See FastSim link below).

ARMulator I was made open source and is the basis for the GNU version of ARMulator. Key differences are in the memory interface and services, also the instruction decode is done differently. The GNU ARMulator is available as part of the GDB debugger in the ARM GNU Tools.

ARMulator II formed the basis for the high accuracy, cycle callable co-verification models of ARM processors, these CoVs models (see Cycle Accurate Simulator) were the basis of many CoVerification systems for ARM processors. Mentor Graphic's Seamless have the market leading CoVs system that supports many ARM cores, and many other CPUs.

ARMulator II shipped in early ARM toolkits as well as the later SDT 2.5, SDT 2.5.1, ADS 1.0, ADS 1.1, ADS 1.2, RVCT 1.0 and also separately as RVISS.

Key contributors to ARMulator II were Mike Williams, Louise Jameson, Charles Lavender, Donald Sinclair, Chris Lamb and Rebecca Bryan (who worked on ARMulator as both an engineer and later as product manager). Significant input was also made by Allan Skillman, who was working on ARM CoVerification models at the time.

A key contributor to ARMulator I was Dave Jaggar.

Special models were produced during the development of CPUs, notably the ARM9E, ARM10 and ARM11, these models helped with architectural decisions such as Thumb-2 and TrustZone.

== See also ==
- ARM architecture
- Computer architecture simulator
- OVPsim
- QEMU
- Simics
