= Spim =

Spim or SPIM may refer to:

- SPIM, another name for instant messaging spam
- SPIM, Selective Plane Illumination Microscopy
- SPIM, a simulated assembly language written for MIPS architecture.
- Single phase induction motor (SPIM), a type of AC induction motor
- Jorge Chávez International Airport in Lima, Peru (Former ICAO airport code SPIM)
- Somali People's Insurgent Movement (SPIM), also known as the Popular Resistance Movement in the Land of the Two Migrations (PRM)
- Southern Plains Indian Museum (SPIM), Anadarko, Oklahoma
