= Instruction set simulator =

Software testing tool

An instruction set simulator (ISS) is a simulation model, usually coded in a high-level programming language, which mimics the behavior of a mainframe or microprocessor by "reading" instructions and maintaining internal variables which represent the processor's registers.

Instruction simulation is a methodology employed for one of several possible reasons:

- To simulate the instruction set architecture (ISA) of a future processor to allow software development and test to proceed without waiting for the development and production of the hardware to finish. This is often known as "shift-left" or "pre-silicon support" in the hardware development field. A full system simulator or virtual platform for the future hardware typically includes one or more instruction set simulators.
- To simulate the machine code of another hardware device or entire computer for upward compatibility.

For example, the IBM 1401 was simulated on the later IBM/360 through use of microcode emulation.

- To monitor and execute the machine code instructions (but treated as an input stream) on the same hardware for test and debugging purposes, e.g. with memory protection (which protects against accidental or deliberate buffer overflow).
- To improve the speed performance—compared to a slower cycle-accurate simulator—of simulations involving a processor core where the processor itself is not one of the elements being verified; in hardware description language design using Verilog where simulation with tools like ISS can be run faster by means of "PLI" (not to be confused with PL/1, which is a programming language).

== Implementation ==
Instruction-set simulators can be implemented using three main techniques:

- Interpretation, where each instruction is executed directly by the ISS.
- Just-in-time compilation (JIT), where the code to be executed is first translated into the instruction set of the host computer. This is typically about ten times faster than a well-optimized interpreter.
- Virtualization, where processor extensions for virtual machines are used to execute instructions in the ISS. This only works for same-on-same instruction-set simulation, such as running x86 simulators on x86 hosts, or ARM simulators on ARM hosts.

An ISS is often provided with (or is itself) a debugger in order for a software engineer/programmer to debug the program prior to obtaining target hardware. GDB is one debugger which has a compiled-in ISS. It is sometimes integrated with simulated peripheral circuits such as timers, interrupts, serial ports, general I/O ports, etc. to mimic the behavior of a microcontroller.

The basic instruction simulation technique is the same regardless of purpose: first execute the monitoring program passing the name of the target program as an additional input parameter.

The target program is then loaded into memory, but control is never passed to the code. Instead, the entry point within the loaded program is calculated, and a pseudo program status word (PSW) is set to this location. The Program Status Word (PSW) is composed of a status register and a program counter, the latter of which signifies the next instruction to be executed. Therefore, it is specifically the program counter that is assigned to this location. A set of pseudo registers are set to what they would have contained if the program had been given control directly.

It may be necessary to amend some of these to point to other pseudo "control blocks" depending on the hardware and operating system. It may also be necessary to reset the original parameter list to 'strip out' the previously added program name parameter.

Thereafter, execution proceeds as follows:

1. Determine length of instruction at pseudo PSW location (initially the first instruction in the target program). If this instruction offset within the program matches a set of previously given "pause" points, set "Pause" reason, go to 7.
2. "Fetch" the instruction from its original location (if necessary) into the monitor's memory. If "trace" is available and "on", store program name, instruction offset and any other values.
3. Depending upon the instruction type, perform pre-execution checks and execute. If the instruction cannot proceed for any reason (invalid instruction, incorrect mode etc.) go to 7. If the instruction is about to alter memory, check memory destination exists (for this thread) and is sufficiently large. If OK, load appropriate pseudo registers into temporary real registers, perform equivalent move with the real registers, save address and length of altered storage if trace is "on" and go to 4. If the instruction is a "register-to-register" operation, load pseudo registers into monitor's real registers, perform operation, store back to respective pseudo registers, go to 4. If the instruction is a conditional branch, determine if the condition is satisfied: if not go to 4, if condition IS satisfied, calculate branch to address, determine if valid (if not, set error = "Wild branch" and go to 7.) If OK, go to 5. If instruction is an operating system call, do real call from monitoring program by "faking" addresses to return control to monitor program and then reset pseudo registers to reflect call; go to 4.
4. Add instruction length to current Pseudo PSW value.
5. Store next address in Pseudo PSW.
6. Go to 1.
7. Halt execution.

For test and debugging purposes, the monitoring program can provide facilities to view and alter registers, memory, and restart location or obtain a mini core dump or print symbolic program names with current data values. It could permit new conditional "pause" locations, remove unwanted pauses and suchlike.

Instruction simulation provides the opportunity to detect errors BEFORE execution which means that the conditions are still exactly as they were and not destroyed by the error. A very good example from the IBM S/360 world is the following instruction sequence that can cause difficulties debugging without an instruction simulation monitor.

     LM    R14,R12,12(R13)   where r13 incorrectly points to string of X"00"s
     BR    R14              causes PSW to contain X"0000002" with program check "Operation Exception"
*                           all registers on error contain nulls.

== Consequences ==
=== Overhead ===
The number of instructions to perform the above basic "loop" (Fetch/Execute/calculate new address) depends on hardware but it could be accomplished on IBM S/360/370/390/ES9000 range of machines in around 12 or 13 instructions for many instruction types. Checking for valid memory locations or for conditional "pause"s add considerably to the overhead but optimization techniques can reduce this to acceptable levels. For testing purposes this is normally quite acceptable as powerful debugging capabilities are provided including instruction step, trace and deliberate jump to test error routine (when no actual error). In addition, a full instruction trace can be used to test actual (executed) code coverage.

=== Added benefits ===
Occasionally, monitoring the execution of a target program can help to highlight random errors that appear (or sometimes disappear) while monitoring but not in real execution. This can happen when the target program is loaded at a different location than normal because of the physical presence of the monitoring program in the same address space.

If the target program picks up the value from a "random" location in memory (one it doesn't 'own' usually), it may for example be nulls (X"00") in almost every normal situation and the program works OK. If the monitoring program shifts the load point, it may pick up say X"FF" and the logic would cause different results during a comparison operation. Alternatively, if the monitoring program is now occupying the space where the value is being "picked up" from, similar results might occur.

Re-entrancy bugs: accidental use of static variables instead of "dynamic" thread memory can cause re-entrancy problems in many situations. Use of a monitoring program can detect these even without a storage protect key.

Illegal operations: some operating systems (or hardware) require the application program to be in the correct "mode" for certain calls to the Operating system. Instruction simulation can detect these conditions before execution.

Hot spot analysis & instruction usage by counting the instructions executed during simulation (which will match the number executed on the actual processor or unmonitored execution), the simulator can provide both a measure of relative performance between different versions of algorithm and also be used to detect "hot spots" where optimization can then be targeted by the programmer. In this role it can be considered a form of performance analysis as it is not easy to obtain these statistics under normal execution and this is especially true for high level language programs which effectively 'disguise' the extent of machine code instructions by their nature.

== Educational purposes ==
Some of these software simulators remains to be used as tools for assembly language and Instruction Set Architecture teaching, with some specifically designed using multiple simulation layers and ISA to ISA simulation, with the ability to even design ISAs and simulate them.

== Criticism ==
In the first volume of The Art of Computer Programming, Donald Knuth wrote: "In the author's opinion, entirely too much programmers' time has been spent in writing such [machine language] simulators and entirely too much computer time has been wasted in using them." In the following section, however, the author gives examples of how such simulators are useful as trace or monitor routines for debugging purposes.

== Example ==
Typical trace output from simulation by monitoring program used for test & debugging:

Program        offset         instruction            Dis-assembled             register/ storage (after execution)
TEST001        000000         X'05C0'                BALR   R12,0              R12=002CE00A
               000002         X'47F0C00E'            BC    15,X'00C'(R12)    
               00000E         X'98ECD00C'            STM   R14,R12,X'00C'(R13)   X'002E0008' ==> X'00004CE,002CE008,..etc....'
               000012         X'45E0C122'            BAL   R14,X'122'(R12)     R14=002C0016
SUB1           000124         X'50E0C28A'            ST    R14,X'28A'(R12)       X'002CE294' ==> X'002C0016'
etc...

== See also ==
Simulators

- ARMulator - CPU simulators for the ARM architecture, provided by ARM itself as both a reference and software development vehicle.
- Computer architecture simulator
- CPU Sim - Java-based program that allows the user to design and create an instruction set and then run programs of instructions from the set through simulation
- gem5 - Modular platform for computer-system architecture research, supporting multiple ISAs and cycle-level simulation.
- Gpsim - PIC microcontroller simulator
- INTERP/8 - Intel 8008 and INTERP/80 for Intel 8080.
- Little man computer - simple Java-based example of an instruction set simulator
- MikroSim - CPU simulator, allowing instruction set definition on microcode level for educational use
- VIP - CPU simulator, allowing instruction set definition on microcode level for educational use
- OVPsim - CPU and full system simulator, providing over 170 instruction accurate models of processors. Allows user defined instruction sets.
- QEMU - Generic and open-source machine emulator and virtualizer using dynamic binary translation (TCG).
- Saturn+, enhanced Saturn CPU and system simulator to run RPL on newer HP graphing calculators with ARM-based processors between 2003–2015
- Simics - CPU and full system simulator framework, building complete models of complex modern hardware.
- Simh - Simulation of 50+ historic computers including full PDP-11 systems with I/O, in development since the 1960's.
- Spike - The standard RISC-V ISA reference simulator (Golden Model).
- SPIM / MARS - Widely used educational simulators for the MIPS architecture.
- CPU-OS Simulator - Integrated RISC type CPU and multithreading operating system educational simulators.

Other

- Binary translation
- Instrumentation (computer programming)
- Just-in-time compilation
- Metaprogramming
