= James Larus =

American Computer Scientist

- Born: September 15, 1958 (age 67)
- Education: Harvard University (AB); UC Berkeley (MSc & PhD)
- Known for: Singularity (operating system)
- Scientific career
- Fields: computer science
- Institutions: Microsoft, University of Wisconsin-Madison, EPFL
- Website: people.epfl.ch/james.larus

James R. Larus is an American computer scientist specializing in programming languages, compilers, and computer architecture. He is professor emeritus at the École Polytechnique Fédérale de Lausanne (EPFL) where he was Dean of the School of Computer and Communication Sciences (IC) from 2014 to 2021.

Before joining EPFL, Larus was a Principal Researcher at Microsoft Research (MSR) from 1998 to 2013. He was at one point the Director of Research and Strategy for Microsoft's eXtreme Computing Group (XCG) where he helped develop the Orleans cloud computing project. He was also one of the two co-leads on Microsoft's Singularity project.

Previously, Larus was an associate professor at University of Wisconsin–Madison in the Computer Science department.

== Education ==
Larus graduated magna cum laude from Harvard University in 1980 with a Bachelor of Arts in applied mathematics. He received a Master of Science and a PhD in Computer Science from the University of California, Berkeley in 1982 and 1989.

== Publications and Notable Work ==
Larus is known for the creation of SPIM, a widely distributed MIPS simulator.

He has written many papers and has an h-index of 67. One of his best known papers is his paper on efficient path profiling.

He is also a co-author of the book Transactional Memory, published in 2007 by Morgan & Claypool.

Larus also helped fund and lead the development of the Decentralized Privacy-Preserving Proximity Tracing (DP-3T) in effort to provide contact tracing as a way to slow the COVID-19 pandemic.

== Achievements ==
Larus was a Harvard College Scholar, a National Science Foundation Young Investigator, and is an ACM Fellow. He has also won numerous awards for his papers over the years.
