= GPUTILS =

gputils
- Original authors: James Bowman, Craig Franklin
- Developer: David Barnett
- Initial release: March 4, 2001; 24 years ago
- Stable release: 1.5.2 / October 23, 2025; 4 months ago
- Written in: C
- Operating system: Cross-platform
- Available in: English, French
- Type: Programming tool
- License: GNU General Public License
- Website: gputils.sourceforge.net

GPUTILS (frequently written gputils) is a GPL-licensed set of tools for the PIC microcontroller, comprising an assembler, disassembler, linker, and object file viewer. It is available for various Unix-like systems, including Linux and macOS, and for Microsoft Windows.

== History ==
gpasm, the GNU PIC assembler, was originally developed by James Bowman and released as version 0.0.3 on July 13, 1998. Craig Franklin extended gpasm into an entire suite of assembler- and linker-related tools and renamed the project to gputils, releasing gputils 0.0.4 on March 4, 2001. The project is currently maintained by David Barnett. GPUTILS was created by Craig Franklin and James Bowman. Currently, it is primarily supported by Molnár Károly. Until recently has been supported Borut Ražem. In the past it has been supported by David Barnett, Scott Dattalo and Marko Kohtala .

== See also ==
- Gpsim
