= BlueStacks =

Chain of cloud-based products

now.gg, Inc.
- Formerly: Bluestack Systems, Inc.
- Type: Private
- Industry: Cloud gaming; mobile gaming; mobile software; PC gaming
- Founded: April 25, 2009; 17 years ago
- Founders: Rosen Sharma, Jay Vaishnav, Suman Saraf
- Headquarters: Campbell, California, United States
- Key people: Rosen Sharma (CEO, president); Suman Saraf (CTO); Hue Harguindeguy (CFO); Jay Vaishnav (founder and SVP of products)
- Products: App Player; BlueStacks X; BlueStacks Air
- Website: www.bluestacks.com

BlueStacks App Player
- Release: October 2011 (alpha)
- Stable release: 5.22.240
- Written in: Java, .NET
- Operating system: Windows 7 or later; macOS Big Sur or later
- Platform: IA-32, x86-64
- Size: 527 MB
- Available in: 48 languages
- Type: Android emulator
- License: Freeware
- Website: bluestacks.com

BlueStacks (also known as BlueStacks by now.gg, Inc.) is a chain of cloud-based online cross-platform products developed by the San Francisco-based company of the same name. The BlueStacks App Player enables the execution of Android applications on computers running Microsoft Windows or macOS.

== History ==
At the Citrix Synergy conference held in San Francisco, an early version of BlueStacks App Player was showcased on stage by Citrix CEO Mark Templeton, who also announced a partnership between the two companies. The initial alpha version of App Player was launched in October 2011, and it exited beta on June 7, 2014. In July 2014, Samsung disclosed its investment in BlueStacks.

== BlueStacks (Android emulator) ==
BlueStacks generates its primary revenue through an Android emulator referred to as App Player. The basic features of the software are available for free, while advanced features require a paid monthly subscription. By February 2021, BlueStacks reported over 1 billion app downloads. The App Player provides support for mouse, keyboard, and external touch-pad controls.

In June 2012, the company introduced an alpha version of its App Player software for macOS, while the beta version was released in December of the same year. In December 2024, it released BlueStacks Air for Apple Silicon Macs.

=== BlueStacks 2 ===
In July 2015, BlueStacks released V2.0 of App Player for macOS. In December 2015, BlueStacks, Inc. introduced BlueStacks 2.0, enabling users to run multiple Android applications simultaneously. BlueStacks 2.0 was also compatible with Mac OS X 10.9 Mavericks or later until 2018.

In April 2016, BlueStacks launched BlueStacks TV, integrating Twitch.tv into the App Player directly, allowing users to livestream their apps to Twitch without additional hardware or software.

In September 2016, the company added Facebook Live integration, enabling users to stream their gameplay to their Facebook profiles, pages they manage, or Facebook Groups they belong to.

=== BlueStacks 3 ===
BlueStacks released BlueStacks 3 in July 2017, featuring a new engine and front-end design. This version introduced App Center for personalized game suggestions, an account system, chat, a new keymapping interface, and multi-instance support. The multi-instance feature permits users to launch multiple BlueStacks windows using the same or different Google Play accounts.

=== BlueStacks 3N ===
In January 2018, BlueStacks released the BlueStacks + N Beta, running on Android 7 (Android Nougat). This was notable as most Android emulators were running Android 4.4 (KitKat) at that time. This version was powered by an upgraded "HyperG" graphics engine that enabled the use of the full array of Android 7 APIs.

=== BlueStacks 4 ===
BlueStacks introduced a new version, BlueStacks 4, in September 2018, BlueStacks 4 demonstrated benchmark results up to 6 times faster than a 2018 generation mobile phone during testing. Dynamic resource management, a new dock and search user interface, an AI-powered key-mapping tool, and support for both 32-bit and 64-bit versions of Android 7.1.2 Nougat were included in this version.

In January 2019, BlueStacks released a 64-bit version of BlueStacks 4 through its early access program, offering improved performance and memory usage by running on a 64-bit version of Android 7.1.2. This version required a 64-bit version of Windows 8 or later with virtualization enabled and Hyper-V disabled. This 64-bit release allows the installation and usage of ARM64-v8a Android applications.

=== BlueStacks 5 ===
BlueStacks unveiled BlueStacks 5 in May 2021, still based on Android 7.1.2 but also offering compatibility with Android 9 (Android Pie), or Android 11 based on user choice. Support for Android 13 is in beta as of July 2026.

=== BlueStacks X ===
In September 2021, BlueStacks launched BlueStacks X, a cloud gaming service based on the Android platform. BlueStacks X utilizes throttling to adjust speed according to a user's internet connection, under the name of Hybrid Cloud. The servers for BlueStacks X's are hosted by now.gg, a subsidiary of BlueStacks.

=== BlueStacks Air ===
In December 2024, BlueStacks launched BlueStacks Air, an Android emulator for Apple Silicon Macs.

== Minimum requirements ==
For Windows, BlueStacks App Player has minimum requirements of Windows 7 or above, 4 GB of RAM, 5 GB of disk space, and an Intel or AMD processor. As of 2026, BlueStacks Air supports Mac systems using Apple Silicon chips (M1-M4). For macOS, minimum requirements include macOS 11 (Big Sur) or higher operating system, 8 GB RAM, and 12 GB disk space.

== See also ==
- Android-x86
- Emulators
- List of emulators
- VirtualBox
