= CPU Sim =

Software development environment

- Original author(s): Dale Skrien
- Stable release: 4.0.11 / August, 2017
- Written in: Java
- Operating system: MS-Windows, Linux, Mac (Cross-platform)
- Type: IDE
- License: GPLv3+
- Website: www.cs.colby.edu/djskrien/CPUSim/

CPU Sim is a software development environment for the simulation of simple computers. It was developed by Dale Skrien to help students understand computer architectures. With this application the user is able to simulate new or existing simple CPUs. Users can create new virtual CPUs with custom machine language instructions, which are implemented by a sequence of micro instructions. CPU Sim allows the user to edit and run assembly language programs for the CPU being simulated.

CPU Sim has been programmed using the Java Swing package. This means that it is platform independent (runs on every platform that has a Java virtual machine installed).

== Wombat 1 Sample CPU ==
A sample computer system, the Wombat 1, is provided with CPU Sim. It has the following registers:

- pc (program counter);
- acc (accumulator);
- ir (instruction register);
- mar (memory address register);
- mdr (memory data register);
- status.

The assembly language of the Wombat 1 computer consists of 12 instructions. Each instruction is stored on 16 bits; the first 4 are the opcode and the other 12 are the address field.

Mnemonic	Operation code	Field length	Meaning
stop	0	16	stops the program execution
load	1	4 12	transfers data from memory to the accumulator
store	2	4 12	transfers data from the accumulator to memory
read	3	4 (12)	puts the data from the IO console to the accumulator
write	4	4 (12)	sends the data from the accumulator to the IO console
add	5	4 12	adds the data from memory to the accumulator and the result is then stored in the accumulator
subtract	6	4 12	subtracts the data from memory from the accumulator and the result is then stored in the accumulator
multiply	7	4 12	multiplies the data from the memory by the accumulator and the result is then stored in the accumulator
divide	8	4 12	divides the data from the memory into the accumulator and the result is then stored in the accumulator
jmpz	9	4 12	jump to address if the accumulator is 0
jmpn	A	4 12	jump to address if the accumulator is negative
jump	B	4 12	unconditioned jump to address

== Features ==
CPU Sim has the following features:

- allows the creation of a CPU (a virtual one), including the registers, RAM, microinstructions, and machine instructions;
- allows the creation, editing, and execution of assembly language programs for the simulated CPU;
- allows stepping forward and backward through the execution of assembly language programs.

== Example program for the Wombat 1 CPU ==
This program reads in integers until a negative integer is read. It then outputs the sum of all the positive integers.

Start:	read		// read n -> acc
	jmpn  Done  	// jump to Done if acc < 0.
	add   sum  	// add sum to the acc
	store sum 	// store the new sum
	jump  Start	// go back & read in next number
Done:	load  sum 	// load the final sum
	write 		// write the final sum
	stop  		// stop

sum:	.data 2 0	// 2-byte location where sum is stored

The following modification of the program is also used sometimes:

Start:	read		// read n -> acc
	jmpz  Done  	// jump to Done if nacc is 0.
	add   sum  	// add sum to the acc
	store sum 	// store the new sum
	jump  Start	// go back & read in next number
Done:	load  sum 	// load the final sum
	write 		// write the final sum
	stop  		// stop

sum:	.data 2 0	// 2-byte location where sum is stored

This one can use negative input to subtract, or 0 to break the loop.

== See also ==
- Comparison of EDA software
- List of free electronics circuit simulators
- Computer architecture simulator
