= Box86 =

X86 emulator for ARM processors

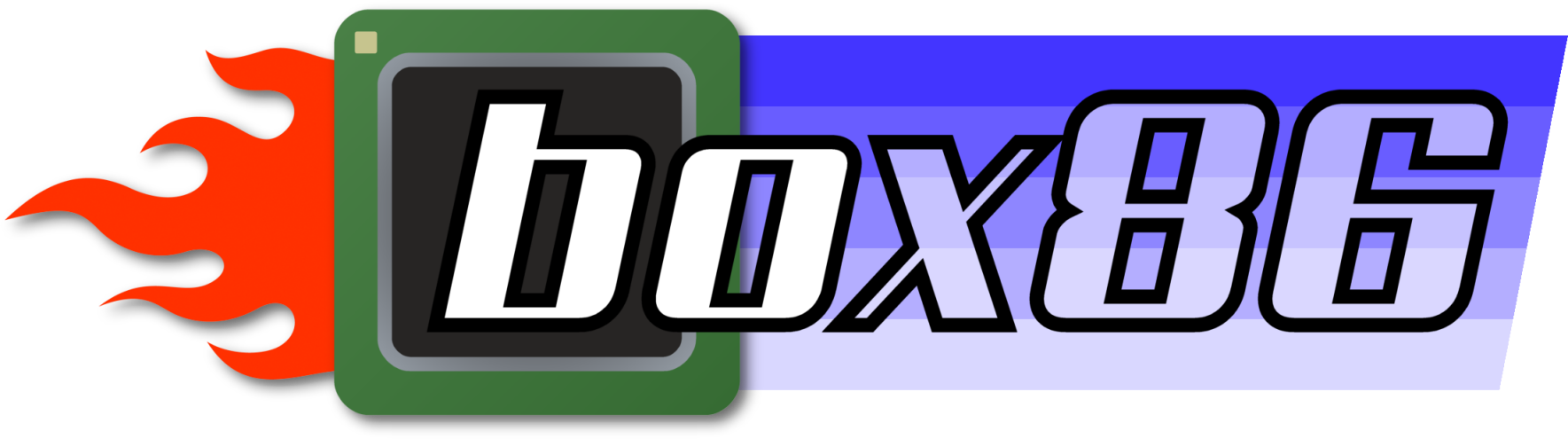
- Developer: Ptitseb
- Stable release: 0.3.8 / 6 December 2024; 16 months ago
- Written in: C
- Operating system: Linux
- Type: Emulator
- License: MIT
- Website: box86.org
- Repository: github.com/ptitSeb/box86

Box86 is an emulator for x86 userspace tools on ARM Linux systems, allowing such systems to execute video games and other programs that have been compiled for x86 Linux systems. Box86 is an alternative to QEMU for user-mode emulation. Box86 also provides dynamic recompilation as well as functionality to intercept dynamic library calls and forward them to equivalent native libraries, allowing applications to run significantly faster than if they were fully emulated.

Box86 also has limited support for running Wine, allowing users to run x86 Windows apps on ARM devices like the Raspberry Pi.

Ptitseb has also released Box64, the ARM64 equivalent of Box86 that helps run x64 programs instead of x86. It also supports the LoongArch and RISC-V (64-bit) architectures, on which DynaCache was added to DynaRec JIT
