= Program status word =

Computer processor element

The program status word (Note: The nomenclature varies among architectures.) (PSW) is a register that performs the function of a status register and program counter, and sometimes more. The term is also applied to a copy of the PSW in storage. This article only discusses the PSW in the IBM System/360 and its successors, and follows the IBM convention of numbering bits starting with 0 as the leftmost (most significant) bit.

Although certain fields within the PSW may be tested or set by using non-privileged instructions, testing or setting the remaining fields may only be accomplished by using privileged instructions.

Contained within the PSW are the two bit condition code, representing zero, positive, negative, overflow, and similar flags of other architectures' status registers. Conditional branch instructions test this encoded as a four bit value, with each bit representing a test of one of the four condition code values, 2^{3} + 2^{2} + 2^{1} + 2^{0}. (Since IBM uses big-endian bit numbering, mask value 8 selects code 0, mask value 4 selects code 1, mask value 2 selects code 2, and mask value 1 selects code 3.)

The 64-bit PSW describes (among other things)

- Interrupt masks
- Privilege states
- Condition code
- Instruction address

In the early instances of the architecture (System/360 and early System/370), the instruction address was 24 (Note: However, a 360/67 equipped with the Extended Dynamic Address Translation feature has a 32-bit mode selected by bit 4 of the PSW in Extended PSW mode (Control Register 6, bit 8).) bits; in later instances (XA/370), the instruction address was 31 bits plus a mode bit (24 bit addressing mode if zero; 31 bit addressing mode if one) for a total of 32 bits.

In the present instances of the architecture (z/Architecture), the instruction address is 64 bits and the PSW itself is 128 bits.

The PSW may be loaded by the LOAD PSW instruction (LPSW or LPSWE). Its contents may be examined with the Extract PSW instruction (EPSW).

== Format ==
=== S/360 ===
On all but 360/20, (Note: Despite the name, the 350/20 does not adhere to the S/360 architecture.) the PSW has the following formats. S/360 Extended PSW format only applies to the 360/67 with bit 8 of control register 6 set.

IBM S/360 PSW formats

S/360 Standard PSW
System Mask						Key		A	M	W	P	Interruption Code	
0					7	8	11	12	13	14	15	16	31
ILC		CC		Program; Mask		Instruction Address							
32	33	34	35	36	39	40							63
S/360 Standard PSW abbreviations: Bits / Field / Meaning; 0-7 / SM / System Mask: Bit / Meaning; 0 / Channel 0 mask; 1 / Channel 1 mask; 2 / Channel 2 mask; 3 / Channel 3 mask; 4 / Channel 4 mask; 5 / Channel 5 mask; 6 / Channel 6 mask; 7 / External Mask; 8-11 / Key / PSW key; 12 / A / ASCII; 13 / M / Machine-check mask; 14 / W / Wait state; 15 / P / Problem state; 16-31 / IC / Interruption Code; 32-33 / ILC / Instruction-Length Code; 34-35 / CC / Condition Code; 36-39 / PM / Program Mask: Bit / Meaning; 36 / Fixed-point overflow; 37 / Decimal overflow; 38 / Exponent underflow; 39 / Significance; 40-63 / IA / Instruction Address

S/360 Extended PSW
spare		24/32; Bit; Mode	Tran; Ctrl	I/O; Mask	Ext. Mask	Key		A	M	W	P	ILC		CC		Program; Mask		spare	
0	3	4	5	6	7	8	11	12	13	14	15	16	17	18	19	20	23	24	31
Instruction Address																			
32																			63
S/360 Extended PSW abbreviations: Bits / Field / Meaning; 0-3 / / Spare (must be 0); 4 / / 24/32-bit Address mode; 5 / / Translation Control; 6 / IO / I/O Mask (Summary); 7 / EX / External Mask (Summary); 8-11 / Key / Protection Key; 12 / A / ASCII; 13 / M / Machine-check mask; 14 / W / Wait state; 15 / P / Problem state; 16-17 / ILC / Instruction-Length Code; 18-19 / CC / Condition Code; 20-23 / PM / Program Mask: Bit / Meaning; 20 / Fixed-point overflow; 21 / Decimal overflow; 22 / Exponent underflow; 23 / Significance; 24-31 / / Spare; 32-63 / IA / Instruction Address

=== S/370 ===
IBM S/370 PSW formats

S/370 Basic Control mode PSW
Chan. Mask						I O	E X	Key		0	M	W	P	Interruption Code	
0	1	2		4	5	6	7	8	11	12	13	14	15	16	31
ILC		CC		Program; Mask				Instruction Address							
32	33	34	35	36			39	40							63
S/370 BC mode PSW abbreviations: Bits / Field / Meaning; 0-5 / / Channel Masks for channels 0-5; 6 / IO / I/O Mask for channels > 5; 7 / EX / External Mask; 8-11 / Key / PSW key; 12 / E=0 / Basic Control mode; 13 / M / Machine-check mask; 14 / W / Wait state; 15 / P / Problem state; 16-31 / IC / Interruption Code; 32-33 / ILC / Instruction-Length Code; 34-35 / CC / Condition Code; 36-39 / PM / Program Mask: Bit / Meaning; 36 / Fixed-point overflow; 37 / Decimal overflow; 38 / Exponent underflow; 39 / Significance; 40-63 / IA / Instruction Address

S/370 Extended Control mode PSW
0	R	0	0	0	T	I O	E X	Key		1	M	W	P	S	0	CC		Program; Mask		0	0	0	0	0	0	0	0
0	1	2		4	5	6	7	8	11	12	13	14	15	16	17	18	19	20	23	24							31
0	0	0	0	0	0	0	0	Instruction Address																			
32							39	40																			63
S/370 EC mode PSW abbreviations: Bits / Field / Meaning; 1 / R / PER Mask; 5 / T / DAT mode; 6 / IO / I/O Mask; subject to channel mask in CR2; 7 / EX / External Mask; subject to external subclass mask in CR0; 8-11 / Key / PSW key; 12 / E=1 / Extended Control mode; 13 / M / Machine-check mask; 14 / W / Wait state; 15 / P / Problem state; 16 / S / Address-Space Control; 0=primary-space mode 1=Secondary-space mode; 18-19 / CC / Condition Code; 20-23 / PM / Program Mask: Bit / Meaning; 20 / Fixed-point overflow; 21 / Decimal overflow; 22 / Exponent underflow; 23 / Significance; 40-63 / IA / Instruction Address

=== S/370 Extended Architecture (S/370-XA) ===
IBM Extended Architecture (XA) PSW format

Extended Architecture Extended Control mode PSW
0	R	0	0	0	T	I O	E X	Key		1	M	W	P	S	0	CC		Program; Mask		0	0	0	0	0	0	0	0
0	1	2		4	5	6	7	8	11	12	13	14	15	16	17	18	19	20	23	24							31
A	Instruction Address																										
32	33																										63
S/370-XA EC mode PSW abbreviations: Bits / Field / Meaning; 1 / R / PER Mask; 5 / T / DAT mode; 6 / IO / I/O Mask; subject to channel mask in CR2; 7 / EX / External Mask; subject to external subclass mask in CR0; 8-11 / Key / PSW key; 12 / E=1 / Extended Control mode; 13 / M / Machine-check mask; 14 / W / Wait state; 15 / P / Problem state; 16 / S / Address-Space Control; 0=primary-space mode 1=Secondary-space mode; 18-19 / CC / Condition Code; 20-23 / PM / Program Mask: Bit / Meaning; 20 / Fixed-point overflow; 21 / Decimal overflow; 22 / Exponent underflow; 23 / Significance; 32 / A / Addressing mode 0=24 bit; 1=31 bit; 33-63 / IA / Instruction Address

=== Enterprise Systems Architecture (ESA) ===
IBM Enterprise Systems Architecture (ESA) PSW format

Enterprise Systems Architecture Extended Control mode PSW
0	R	0	0	0	T	I O	E X	Key		1	M	W	P	AS		CC		Program; Mask		0	0	0	0	0	0	0	0
0	1	2		4	5	6	7	8	11	12	13	14	15	16	17	18	19	20	23	24							31
A	Instruction Address																										
32	33																										63
ESA EC mode PSW abbreviations: Bits / Field / Meaning; 1 / R / PER Mask; 5 / T / DAT mode; 6 / IO / I/O Mask; subject to channel mask in CR2; 7 / EX / External Mask; subject to external subclass mask in CR0; 8-11 / Key / PSW key; 12 / E=1 / Extended Control mode; 13 / M / Machine-check mask; 14 / W / Wait state; 15 / P / Problem state; 16-17 / AS / Address-Space Control; 00=primary-space mode 01=Access-register mode 10=Secondary-space mode 11=Home-space mode; 18-19 / CC / Condition Code; 20-23 / PM / Program Mask: Bit / Meaning; 20 / Fixed-point overflow; 21 / Decimal overflow; 22 / Exponent underflow (Note: Bit 22 is renamed as HFP exponent underflow in ESA/390); 23 / Significance (Note: Bit 23 is renamed as HFP significance in ESA/390); 32 / A / Addressing mode 0=24 bit; 1=31 bit; 33-63 / IA / Instruction Address

=== z/Architecture ===
IBM z/Architecture PSW formats

z/Architecture long PSW
0	R	0	0	0	T	I O	E X	Key		0	M	W	P	AS		CC		Program; Mask		R I	0	0	0	0	0	0	E A
0	1	2		4	5	6	7	8	11	12	13	14	15	16	17	18	19	20	23	24						30	31
B A	0																										
32	33																										63
Instruction Address																											
64																											95
Instruction Address (Continued)																											
96																											127
Long PSW abbreviations: Bits / Field / Meaning; 1 / R / PER Mask; 5 / T / DAT mode; 6 / IO / I/O mask; 7 / EX / External Mask; 8-11 / Key / PSW key; 12 / E=0 / Must be zero for LPSWE; 13 / M / Machine-check mask; 14 / W / Wait state; 15 / P / Problem state; 16-17 / AS / Address-Space Control; 00=primary-space mode 01=Access-register mode 10=Secondary-space mode 11=Home-space mode; 18-19 / CC / Condition Code; 20-23 / PM / Program Mask: Bit / Meaning; 20 / Fixed-point overflow; 21 / Decimal overflow; 22 / HFP Exponent underflow; 23 / HFP Significance; 24 / RI / Reserved for IBM; 31 / EA / Extended Addressing mode 0=defined by BA below; 1=64-bit, BA must be zero; 32 / BA / Basic Addressing mode 0=24 or 64; 1=31; 64-127 / IA / Instruction Address

z/Architecture short PSW
0	R	0	0	0	T	I O	E X	Key		1	M	W	P	AS		CC		Program; Mask		R I	0	0	0	0	0	0	E A
0	1	2		4	5	6	7	8	11	12	13	14	15	16	17	18	19	20	23	24	25					30	31
B A	Instruction Address																										
32	33																										63
Short PSW abbreviations: Bits / Field / Meaning; 1 / R / PER Mask; 5 / T / DAT mode; 6 / IO / I/O mask; 7 / EX / External Mask; 8-11 / Key / PSW key; 12 / E=1 / Must be one for LPSW; 13 / M / Machine-check mask; 14 / W / Wait state; 15 / P / Problem state; 16-17 / AS / Address-Space Control; 00=primary-space mode 01=Access-register mode 10=Secondary-space mode 11=Home-space mode; 18-19 / CC / Condition Code; 20-23 / PM / Program Mask: Bit / Meaning; 20 / Fixed-point overflow; 21 / Decimal overflow; 22 / HFP Exponent underflow; 23 / HFP Significance; 24 / RI / Reserved for IBM; 31 / EA / Extended Addressing mode 0=defined by BA below; 1=64-bit, BA must be zero; 32 / BA / Basic Addressing mode 0=24 or 64; 1=31; 33-63 / IA / Instruction Address
