= Computer (magazine) =

- Language: English
- Edited by: Jeffery Voas

Publication details
- History: 1970–present
- Publisher: IEEE Computer Society (United States)
- Frequency: Monthly
- Open access: No
- Impact factor: 2.256 (2021)

Standard abbreviations
- ISO 4: Computer

Indexing
- CODEN: CPTRB4
- ISSN: 0018-9162 (print); 1558-0814 (web)
- LCCN: 74648480
- OCLC no.: 2240099

Links
- Journal homepage

Computer is an IEEE Computer Society practitioner-oriented magazine issued to all members of the society. It contains peer-reviewed articles, regular columns, and interviews on current computing-related issues. Computer provides information regarding current research developments, trends, best practices, and changes in the computing profession. Subscriptions of the magazine are provided free of cost to IEEE Computer Society members.

Computer covers all aspects of computer science. Since 2009, it has a digital edition too. The current editor in chief (since 1 January 2020) is Jeff Voas of NIST. Its impact factor was 1.94 for 2017, and 3.564 for 2018. The magazine is the recipient of the 2015 APEX Award for Publication Excellence. Computer won the 2018 Folio: Eddie Award for its September 2017 issue, "Blockchain Technology in Finance", in the category of Association/Nonprofit, App/Digital Edition. Computer also received Folio: Eddie Digital Award honorable mentions in 2019, 2017, and 2016.
