= OVPsim =

Full-system simulator

- Developer: Imperas
- Stable release: 20231026.0 / 26 October 2023; 2 years ago
- Operating system: Windows, Linux
- Type: Emulator
- License: Proprietary, Apache License version 2.0 for models
- Website: www.ovpworld.org

OVPsim is a multiprocessor platform emulator (often called a full-system simulator) used to run unchanged production binaries of the target hardware. It has public APIs allowing users to create their own processor, peripheral and platform models. Various models are available as open source. OVPsim is a key component of the Open Virtual Platforms initiative (OVP), an organization created to promote the use of open virtual platforms for embedded software development. OVPsim requires OVP registration to download.

== Licensing ==
OVPsim is developed and maintained by Imperas. The core simulation platform is proprietary software; it is available free of charge for non-commercial usage. Commercial usage requires a low-cost license from Imperas to cover maintenance. Various processor, peripheral and platform models are available as free software under the Apache License version 2.0.

== Details ==
There are three main components of OVP: open-source models, fast OVPsim simulator, and modeling APIs. These components are designed to make it easy to assemble multi-core heterogeneous or homogeneous platforms with complex memory hierarchies, cache systems and layers of embedded software that can run at hundreds of MIPS on standard desktop PCs. OVPSim is considered instruction accurate, but not cycle-accurate. There are many examples of components, and complete virtual platforms that can boot a Linux kernel in under 5 seconds at OVP homepage.

== Open source models ==
Within OVP there are several different model categories. These models are provided as both pre-compiled object code, and as in some cases, source files. OVPsim no longer supplies source code for the ARM and MIPS processor models. Currently there are processor models of ARM (processors using the ARMv4, ARMv5, ARMv6, ARMv7, ARMv8 instruction sets) up to the ARM Cortex-A72MPx4 (and including multi-cluster ARMv8 models with GICv3), Imagination MIPS (processors using MIPS32, MIPS64, microMIPS, nanoMIPS and MIPS R6 instruction sets) up to the microAptiv, interAptiv, proAptiv, and Warrior cores, Synopsys Virage ARC600/ARC700 and ARC EM series, Renesas v850, RH850, RL78 and m16c, PowerPC, Altera Nios II, Xilinx MicroBlaze, RISC-V (models using 32bit RV32I, RV32M, RV32IM, RV32A, RV32IMA, RV32IMAC, RV32F, RV32D, RV32E, RV32EC, RV32C, RV32G, RV32GC, RV32GCN, RV32IMAFD and 64bit RV64I, RV64M, RV64IMAC, RV64F, RV64D, RV64C, RV64G, RV64GC, RV64GCN, RV64IMAFD ISA subsets), Andes Technology N25/NX25, N25F/NX25F, A25/AX25, A25F/AX25F, Microsemi CoreRISCV/MiV-RV32IMA, SiFive E31, E51, U54, U54-MC, Freedom U540, Codasip Series 1, 3, 5, 7 RISC-V cores, Intel NiosV RISC-V core, Texas Instruments TMS320 DSP, and OpenRisc families. The OpenHW Group uses OVPsim as the golden reference for their open source RISC-V CV32E40 and CV32E20 cores. There are also models of many different types of system components including RAM, ROM, cache, and bridge. There are peripheral models such as Ethernet MAC, USB, DMA, UART, and FIFO. Several different pre-built platforms are available, including the most common operating systems ucLinux, Linux, Android, FreeRTOS, Nucleus, Micrium.

One of the main uses of the OVP simulation infrastructure is the ability to create and simulate custom built models—either from scratch, or by using one of the open source models as a starting point. The OVP APIs are tailored to different model types: processors, behavioral models of peripherals, and platforms. There are over 100 source model variants available to download.

== OVPsim simulator ==
The OVPsim simulator is available as an OVP reference and is free for non-commercial usage. The simulator uses dynamic binary translation technology to achieve very high simulation speeds. More than a billion simulated instructions per second is possible, in some cases on regular desktop PC machines. OVPsim is available for x86 Windows and Linux hosts.

OVPsim comes with a GDB RSP (Remote Serial Protocol) interface to allow applications running on simulated processors to be debugged with any standard debugger that supports this GDB RSP interface. OVPsim comes with the Imperas iGui Graphical Debugger and also an Eclipse IDE and CDT interface.

OVPsim can be encapsulated and called from within other simulation environments and comes as standard with interface files for C, C++, and SystemC. OVPsim includes native SystemC TLM2.0 interface files. It is also possible to encapsulate legacy models of processors and behavioral models so that they can be used by OVPsim.

== Modeling APIs ==
OVP models are created using C/C++ APIs. There are three main APIs: OP, VMI, BHM/PPM.

=== OP ===
The OP API is designed for controlling, connecting, and observing platforms. This API can be called from C, C++, or SystemC. The platform provides the basic structure of the design and creates, connects, and configures the components. The platform also specifies the address mapping, and software that is loaded on the processors. It is very easy with OP to specify very complex and complete platforms of many different processors, local and shared memories, caches, bus bridges, peripherals and all their complex address maps, interrupts and operating systems and application software.

The OP API superseded the ICM API during 2016. The ICM API is still usable for older platforms.

=== VMI ===
Processor modeling is provided by the VMI API. These API functions provide the ability to easily describe the behavior of the processor. A processor model written in C using the VMI decodes the target instruction to be simulated and translates this to native x86 instructions that are then executed on the PC. VMI can be used for modeling 8, 16, 32, and 64 bit architectures. There is an interception mechanism enabling emulation of calls to functions in the application runtime libraries (such as write, fstat etc.) without requiring modification of either the processor model or the simulated application.

=== PPM & BHM ===
Behavioral components, peripherals, and the overall environment is modeled using C code and calls to these two APIs. Underlying these APIs is an event based scheduling mechanism to enable modeling of time, events, and concurrency. Peripheral models provide callbacks that are called when the application software running on processors modeled in the platform access memory locations where the peripheral is enabled.

== Users ==
OVPsim is being used by multiple educational establishments to provide a simulation infrastructure for the research of parallel computing platforms, hardware/software co-design, performance analysis of embedded systems, and as the basis of other embedded tool developments. It is also leveraged for educational courses to allow students to develop and debug application software and create virtual platforms and new models.

A number of leading commercial organizations also use OVPsim as the basis of their product offerings. The technology was licensed by MIPS Technologies to provide modeling support for their MIPS architecture embedded processor range, features in a partnership with leading processor provider ARM, and is part of the Europractice product range for general access to European universities. A version of OVPsim is used by the RISC-V Foundation's Compliance Working Group as a reference simulator. Leading Semiconductor companies such as Renesas have used the simulator for its processor development work, as disclosed in leading electronic industry publications. It was selected by NEPHRON+, an EU research project, for its software and test development environment. VinChip Systems Inc. of Chennai, India used OpenOCD and OVPsim to develop what may be the first 32-bit processor developed in India. The OVP models and virtual platforms form the basis for other activities being undertaken by Imperas.
