= Computer architecture simulator =

Program that simulates the execution of computer architecture

A computer architecture simulator is a program that simulates the execution of computer architecture.

Computer architecture simulators are used for the following purposes:

- Lowering cost by evaluating hardware designs without building physical hardware systems.
- Enabling access to unobtainable hardware.
- Increasing the precision and volume of computer performance data.
- Introducing abilities that are not normally possible on real hardware such as running code backwards when an error is detected or running in faster-than-real time.

== Categories ==
Computer architecture simulators can be classified into many different categories depending on the context.

- Scope: Microarchitecture simulators model the microprocessor and its components. Full-system simulators also model the processor, memory systems, and I/O devices.
- Detail: Functional simulators, such as instruction set simulators, achieve the same function as modeled components. They can be simulated faster if timing is not considered. Timing simulators are functional simulators that also reproduce timing. Timing simulators can be further categorized into digital cycle-accurate and analog sub-cycle simulators.
- Workload: Trace-driven simulators (also called event-driven simulators) react to pre-recorded streams of instructions with some fixed input. Execution-driven simulators allow dynamic change of instructions to be executed depending on different input data.

=== Full-system simulators ===
A full-system simulator is execution-driven architecture simulation at such a level of detail that complete software stacks from real systems can run on the simulator without any modification. A full system simulator provides virtual hardware that is independent of the nature of the host computer. The full-system model typically includes processor cores, peripheral devices, memories, interconnection buses, and network connections. Emulators are full system simulators that imitate obsolete hardware instead of under development hardware.

The defining property of full-system simulation compared to an instruction set simulator is that the model allows real device drivers and operating systems to be run, not just single programs. Thus, full-system simulation makes it possible to simulate individual computers and networked computer nodes with all their software, from network device drivers to operating systems, network stacks, middleware, servers, and application programs.

Full system simulation can speed the system development process by making it easier to detect, recreate and repair flaws. The use of multi-core processors is driving the need for full system simulation, because it can be extremely difficult and time-consuming to recreate and debug errors without the controlled environment provided by virtual hardware. This also allows the software development to take place before the hardware is ready, thus helping to validate design decisions.

=== Cycle-accurate simulator ===
A cycle-accurate simulator is a computer program that simulates a microarchitecture on a cycle-by-cycle basis. In contrast, an instruction set simulator simulates an instruction set architecture usually faster but not cycle-accurate to a specific implementation of this architecture; they are often used when emulating older hardware, where time precision is important for legacy reasons. Often, a cycle-accurate simulator is used when designing new microprocessors – they can be tested, and benchmarked accurately (including running full operating system, or compilers) without actually building a physical chip, and easily change design many times to meet expected plan.

Cycle-accurate simulators must ensure that all operations are executed in the proper virtual (or real if it is possible) time – branch prediction, cache misses, fetches, pipeline stalls, thread context switching, and many other subtle aspects of microprocessors.

== See also ==
- Instruction set simulator
