= Replica 1 =

Clone of the Apple I

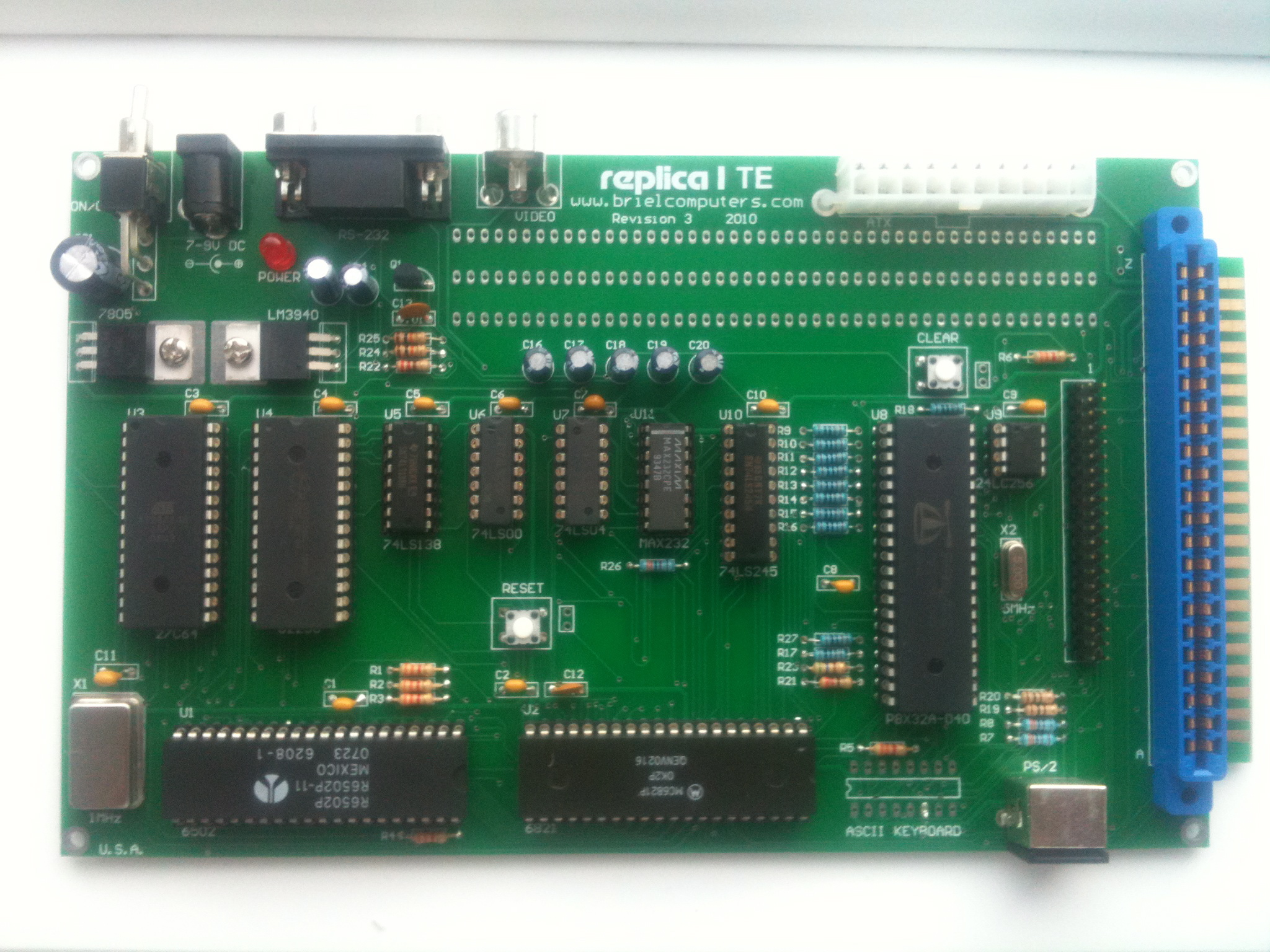
- Developer: Briel Computers
- Released: 2003
- Introductory price: US$149.00
- CPU: 6502 or 65C02 @ 1 MHz
- Memory: 32 KB SRAM, 8 KB EEPROM
- Display: 40x24 character text

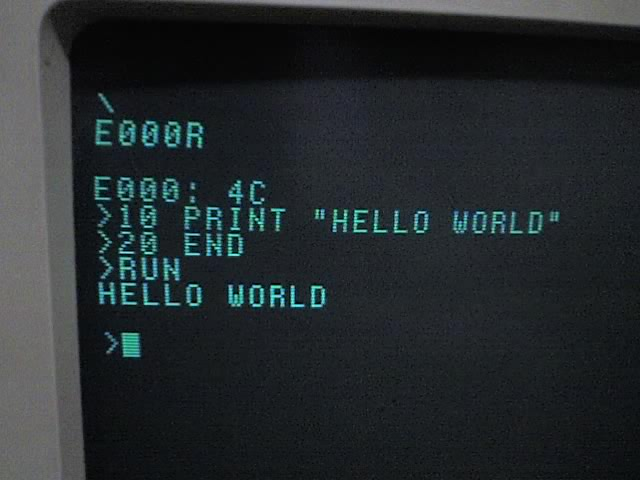
From the "Woz" monitor "\" select hexadecimal memory location "E000" with "R" postfix requesting execution from that point to enter the Basic interpreter. From the interpreter's ">" prompt a "Hello World" program is entered and run. This should be identical to how an Apple I would perform.

The Replica 1 is a clone of the historic Apple I of 1976. It was designed by Vince Briel in 2003. It was the first Apple 1 clone to take advantage of more modern components, enabling the clone to be produced with cheaper and more widely available components while retaining the functionality of the original.

== History ==
The Replica 1 is a clone of the Apple I designed by Vince Briel with permission from the Apple I's original creator Steve Wozniak. The Replica 1 is functionally a close copy of the original but it was designed using much more modern parts on a smaller, simplified board design. The Replica 1 is designed around the same MOS Technology 6502 chip used as the core of the Apple I. Like the original, the Replica 1 utilizes simple AV in/out to connect to a television or other similar screen. It maintains most of the original's functionality, such as the lack of a "delete" key.

=== Development ===
Briel has described how his first prototype was developed on a (solderless) breadboard, with confirmation of success being the detection of bits corresponding to an "\" character on the output of the Peripheral Interface Adapter chip. Briel said his next prototype breadboard (Note: The associated picture shows a soldered or wirewrap breadboard with sockets for the integrated circuits) used a microcontroller to output to a terminal or terminal emulator program. (Note: This would have been a serial interface, this version did not have a video controller) The final prototype used a printed circuit board, and had the addition of a circuitry that implemented a 40x24 character output as per the Apple I. The only change from this prototype to the first revision a production board was the addition of a PS/2 keyboard connector. (Note: This made it possible to connect any widely available PS/2 keyboard rather than the rarer ASCII keyboard which the Apple I requried.)

The first commercial revision of the Replica 1 came with a separate Serial I/O card. This made it possible to store programs written on or for the Replica 1 on the hard drive of any common PC. This was needed because the Replica 1 had no other means of program storage, since cassette drives (the Apple I's storage device) are in short supply. The I/O card can also be attached to original Apple I computers.

Apple had no objection to the project since Wozniak had given his approval and the design is technically Wozniak's alone since it predates the company itself. Apple had previously released all materials regarding the Apple I to the Apple I Owners Club.

=== Original ===
The Replica 1 was first introduced to the market between 2003, and 2005. It was always provided both as a build-it-yourself kit as well as pre-assembled. Power was provided via a 12 pin connector compatible with a PC/XT power supply. Input could be from an ASCII-style keyboard as used in Apple, the more commonly available standard PC keyboard connected via PS/2-style connector, or a terminal or terminal emulator connected via the optional add-on piggy-back serial card. AVR microcontrollers were used both for the video control circuitry and keyboard interface.

There was a special connector electrically compatible with the Apple 1 interface but which required an expansion card to provide the correct physical interface. The board also contained a small breadboard area where custom circuitry and components could be fitted. An example of use of the breadboard area is Tranter's automatic power-on-reset modification using a 555 timer chip.

As well as the Woz (Note: The monitor is named after Steve Wozniak who designed the Apple 1 and wrote the Machine code monitor in 256 bytes of code) monitor, the Replica 1 included (integer) Apple I BASIC in ROM to allow quick and easy programming.

Memory was provided by a 32K byte 62256 static RAM Chip. (Note: The original Apple I included a mere 4K bytes of dynamic RAM by default, the dynamic RAM being cheaper but more difficult to implement successfully. In the 25 years between 1976 and 2003, RAM prices had decreased dramatically and the cost and simplicity of the use of a single 32K static RAM would be in spirit of the Replica 1 design philosophy.)

=== Second edition ===
The Second Edition (SE) was introduced in 2006, the redesign bringing several connectors to the board and sacrificing the breadboard area for the associated circuitry. The SE allowed for multiple options for powering the Replica 1: external 20 pin ATX standard PC power supply; 7-9 volt DC jack connector; or optional power via USB port. A serial port was fitted to the board eliminating the need for the piggy-back board.

The video output could prove problematic with this version especially on some equipment with the issues likely worse on European 60 Hz based display systems.

With the SE version the firmware EEPROM was also to include the KRUSADER symbolic assembler.{Sfn| specifically developed by for the Replica 1. KRUSADER was developed by Ken Wessen, who described its programming environment as including a simple shell, editor, disassembler and a low-level debugger all fitting within a space of under 4096 bytes.

=== Third edition ===
The Third Edition (TE) was introduced in 2008. On it, the ATMega circuits were replaced with a Parallax Propeller chip to control the video output and keyboard input. The resulting space savings meant that a prototyping breadboard area could be re-introduced to the design. Expansion was supplemented by an Apple-1-compatible 44-pin expansion slot and edge connector. This made it possible to directly slot an Apple-1-compatible add-on card into the Replica 1. USB was eliminated from this board.

=== Ten anniversary edition ===
In 2013, on the tenth anniversary of the creation of the Replica 1, Briels introduced a version known as the TEN which has a limited run of 50 boards notable for using a red colored board. For most practical purposes these were the same as the Replica 1 plus that was to follow a year later.

=== Replica 1 plus ===
The most recent model of the Replica 1 is the Replica 1 Plus, now sold by ReActivemicro. The Second Edition model integrated both the previous Serial I/O board plus a new USB interface into the main board. Other improvements included a wall mounted DC power supply replacing the previous model's reliance on a full PC power supply and a power on light indicator. The Third Edition model removed the USB interface and replaced the AVR microcontroller used to generate video with a Parallax Propeller chip.

Briel's announcement for the Replica 1 Plus version in May 2014 claimed it allowed for a direct connection to the USB port on a computer for power and programming, and it had two firmware ROMs allowing selection of either Apple 1 Basic or Woz monitor and Applesoft lite.

On 1 March 2018 ReActiveMicro announced they had formed a partnership with Briel and henceforth would be selling and supporting Replica 1 plus.

== Assembling Replica 1 ==
Some care is required in assembling Replica 1. In particular, proficient soldering technique is required. At KansasFest in July 2009 Briel held a workshop to help new Replica 1 owners construct their machine, Computerworld magazine editor Ken Gagne documenting errors he made in process of completing a working machine.

== Interfacing capability ==
The original and Second Edition (SE) versions of the Replica 1 did not contain an Apple 1 compatible expansion connector (slot), but instead there was available an expansion board that could be connected and that did contain additional expansion slots. The Third Edition (TE) and later models do contain an Apple 1 compatible slot which can either be used to connect an additional Apple 1 compatible add-on board or to connect to the expansion board so additional original Apple or third party expansion boards can be attached. Expansion boards included the CFFA1 Card Reader and Multi I/O Board by Briel Computers.

Other connectors include (model dependent):

- RS-232 Serial port: for interfacing with a home computer running a terminal emulation program, such as HyperTerminal for Windows, or ZTerm for OS X. This allows for quick data inputting for large programs, which is favourable over typing in such programs by hand.
- Apple 1 Edge Connector: for memory expansion boards.
