= Mensch (disambiguation) =

Mensch is a Yiddish word meaning a person of integrity and honor, from the German word for human being.

Mensch may also refer to:

- Mensch (album), a 2002 album by Herbert Grönemeyer
  - "Mensch" (song), the title song from album above
- Mensch (surname), people with that name
- Der Mensch, a 1940 book by Arnold Gehlen
- Mensch Computer, named after Bill Mensch
- Mensch on a Bench, a stuffed toy
