= Bill Mensch =

American electrical engineer (born 1945)

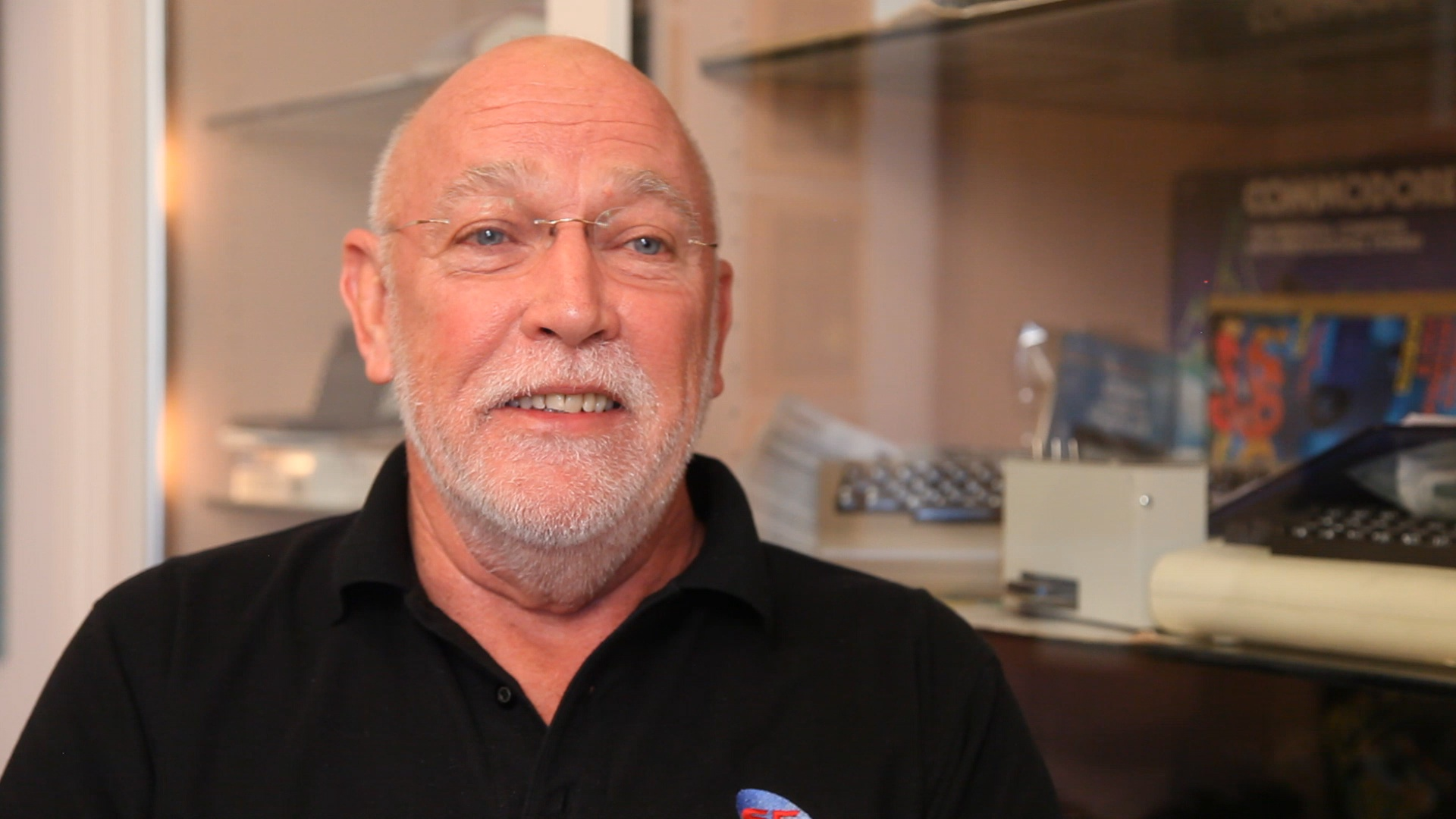
- Mensch in 2014
- Born: February 9, 1945 (age 81); Quakertown, Pennsylvania, U.S.
- Education: B.S.; University of Arizona; A.S.; Temple University
- Occupation: Microprocessor designer
- Known for: Motorola 6800; MOS Technology 6502; Western Design Center

William David Mensch Jr. (born February 9, 1945) is an American electrical engineer born in Quakertown, Pennsylvania. He was a major contributor to the design of the Motorola 6800 8-bit microprocessor and was part of the team led by Chuck Peddle that created the MOS Technology 6502. He also designed the 16-bit successor to the 6502, the 65816.

Mensch is the founder, chairman, and chief executive officer (CEO) of the Western Design Center (WDC) located in Mesa, Arizona. Before founding WDC in 1978, Mensch held design engineering and management positions at Philco-Ford, Motorola, MOS Technology, and Integrated Circuit Engineering. At WDC, Mensch worked mainly on extending and expanding the 6502 architecture. His designs are used widely in embedded systems and implantable, electronic, life-support devices.

== Education, teaching and honors ==
Mensch graduated with an associate degree (A.S.) from Temple University in 1966 where he was a member of Sigma Pi fraternity. He received his Bachelor of Science (B.S.) degree in electrical engineering from the University of Arizona in Tucson in 1971. He has taught classes at Arizona State University, including courses on system on chip (SoC) integrated circuit (IC) design. Mensch is a Senior Member of the Institute of Electrical and Electronics Engineers (IEEE). In 2004, he was inducted in the Computer Hall of Fame (hosted by the San Diego Computer Museum, part of the San Diego State University Library), and in 2005 was presented with a Lifetime Achievement Award from the University of Arizona's College of Engineering.

== Engineering achievements ==
Based on his participation in the basic circuit design, definition, and system design of the Motorola 6800 microprocessor and supporting computer chips, Mensch is a co-holder of several 6800 family patents, including the 6800 central processing unit (CPU), 6820/21 Peripheral Interface Adapter (PIA), 6850 Asynchronous Communications Interface Adapter (ACIA), and 6860 modem chip. He was the sole IC design engineer of the 6820/21 PIA, which was the first peripheral IC to have bit-programmable input/output (I/O).

Before the 6800 family, Mensch had worked on the Mostek 5065 processor.

=== MOS 6502 ===
Along with three other engineers at MOS Technology, Mensch holds the patent on the decimal correct circuitry in the 6502 CPU. He was responsible for the design of basic circuits, oscillator, and buffer, transistor sizing, and instruction decode logic, wishing to minimize the number of levels of logic to achieve faster operation. During this time, when it was common to make errors during design, Chuck Peddle had praised Mensch as a skillful designer and engineer:

«He built seven different chips without ever having an error, almost all done by hand. When I tell people that, they don't believe me, but it's true. This guy is a unique person. He is the best layout guy in the world.»

Before leaving MOS Technology in 1977, Mensch became their microprocessor design manager.

== Western Design Center ==
Shortly after Mensch founded the Western Design Center (WDC) in 1978, Commodore International contracted the company to develop what they called a "macro-micro", a macro-programmed complementary metal–oxide–semiconductor (CMOS) processor that could be used in a small and powerful calculator. However, WDC was unable to complete the project, and Commodore ended their relationship with the new company. Mensch claimed that Commodore never intended to use his design, and were instead seeking leverage to get a better deal for competing chips from Japanese producer Toshiba.

The first major effort of Mensch and his team was developing the WDC 65C02, an enhanced version of the NMOS 6502 microprocessor. The 65C02, in addition to being implemented in CMOS circuit technology that reduced power use and improved noise immunity, added some new instructions, and corrected several defects in the NMOS 6502. The 65C02 was subsequently adopted for use in the Apple IIc computer and, later, in an enhanced version of the Apple IIe.

Mensch's next design, which was to become an important product at WDC, was a 65C02-compatible 16-bit microprocessor, the 65C816, later designated W65C816S. The 65C816's design came about following consultation with Apple and was adopted by them for use in the Apple IIGS computer. The 65C816 was later chosen as the core of the Ricoh 5A22 processor that powered the Super Nintendo Entertainment System.

Mensch developed the Mensch Computer as a means to promote the W65C816S microprocessor. It was a system designed around the WDC W65C265S microcontroller, which contains a W65C816S core. The computer, which includes the Mensch Works software suite, was produced for a time by WDC and was made for hobby and education uses.

Chuck Peddle and Bill Mensch are regarded as personal computer pioneers, because both the 6502 technology and business model were instrumental in helping launch the personal computer revolution.

== Personal life ==
Mensch has five children and resides with his wife, Dianne, in Superstition Mountain, Arizona.
