= Mensch Computer =

The Mensch Computer is a personal computer system produced by the Western Design Center (WDC). It is based on the WDC 65C265 microcontroller, which implements the instruction sets of two microprocessors: the 16-bit W65C816/65816, and the 8-bit 6502. The computer is named after Bill Mensch, designer of the 6502 and subsequent series of microprocessor.

The system is designed for hobbyists and people who enjoy computer programming, especially at the assembly language level, and includes a basic set of peripherals which can be expanded by the owner. Much software originally written for other computer systems which use the 65816 or 6502 instruction sets (such as the Nintendo Entertainment System, Super Nintendo, or Apple IIGS, among others) can be run on the Mensch Computer (either directly as binary object code or through reassembling the software source code), to the extent that such software does not rely on hardware configurations which differ from the Mensch Computer.

The Mensch Computer includes a read-only memory (ROM) machine code monitor (a type of firmware), and many software routines are available to programmers by calling subroutines in the ROM. Typically, the system runs Mensch Works, a software suite also named after Bill Mensch.
