= Mensch (surname) =

Mensch is a surname. Notable people with the surname include:

- Amy Mensch, American mechanical engineer, combustion scientist, and expert on fire safety
- Arthur Mensch (born 1992), French artificial intelligence researcher and entrepreneur
- Bill Mensch (born 1945), American electrical engineer
- Bob Mensch (born 1945), American Republican politician
- David Mensch (born 1972), Australian Rules footballer
- Daniël Mensch (born 1978), Dutch rower
- Hannelore Mensch (born 1937), German politician
- Homer Mensch (1914–2005)), American classical double bass player
- Louise Mensch (born 1971), British author and politician
- Peter van Mensch (born 1947), Dutch museologist
- Peter Mensch (born 1953), musical acts manager
