= Ricoh 5A22 =

Microprocessor made by Ricoh for the Super Nintendo Entertainment System

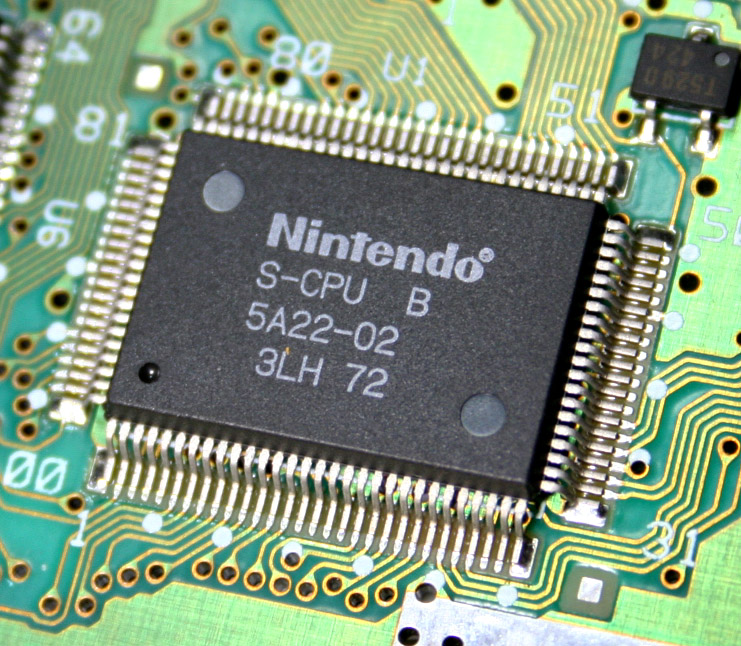
- Ricoh 5A22-02

General information
- Designed by: Ricoh and Western Design Center

Performance
- Max. CPU clock rate: 1.79 MHz to 3.58 MHz
- Data width: 8-bit
- Address width: 24-bit

The Ricoh 5A22 is an 8/16-bit microprocessor produced by Ricoh for the Super Nintendo Entertainment System (SNES) video game console. It is based on the 8/16-bit WDC 65C816, which was developed between 1982 and 1984 for the Apple IIGS personal computer. It has 92 instructions, an 8-bit data bus, a 16-bit accumulator, and a 24-bit address bus. The CPU runs between 1.79 MHz and 3.58 MHz, and uses an extended MOS Technology 6502 instruction set.

== Major features ==
In addition to the 65C816 CPU core, the 5A22 contains support hardware, including:

- Controller port interface circuits, including serial access to controller data
- An 8-bit parallel I/O port, which is mostly unused in the SNES
- Circuitry for generating non-maskable interrupts on V-blank
- Circuitry for generating interrupts on calculated screen positions
- A DMA unit, supporting two primary modes:
  - General DMA, for block transfers at a rate of 2.68 MB/s
  - H-blank DMA, for transferring small data sets at the end of each scanline outside of the active display period
- Multiplication and division registers
- Two separate address busses driving the 8-bit data bus: a 24-bit "Bus A" for general access, and an 8-bit "Bus B" mainly for APU and PPU registers

== Performance ==
The CPU as a whole employs a variable-speed system bus, with bus access times determined by the memory location accessed. The bus runs at 3.58 MHz for non-access cycles and when accessing Bus B and most internal registers, and either 2.68 or 3.58 MHz when accessing Bus A. It runs at 1.79 MHz only when accessing the controller port serial-access registers. It works at approximately 1.5 MIPS, and has a theoretical peak performance of 1.79 million 16-bit operations per second.

== See also ==
- Super Nintendo Entertainment System technical specifications
- Nintendo SA-1, a co-processor for the SNES based on the same 65C816 CPU core
