= Western Design Center =

American company

The Western Design Center, Inc.
- Type: Private
- Industry: Electronics
- Founded: 1978; 48 years ago
- Founder: Bill Mensch
- Headquarters: Mesa, Arizona, United States
- Area served: Worldwide
- Products: 65C02, 65C816
- Website: westerndesigncenter.com

The Western Design Center (WDC), located in Mesa, Arizona, is a company that develops intellectual property for, and licenses manufacture of, MOS Technology 65xx based microprocessors and microcontrollers. WDC was founded in 1978 by a former MOS Technology employee and co-holder of the MOS Technology 6502 patent, Bill Mensch. Prior to leaving MOS Technology in 1977 Mensch was the microprocessor design manager at MOS Technology.

Beyond discrete devices, WDC offers device designs in the form of semiconductor intellectual property cores (IP cores) to use inside other chips such as application-specific integrated circuit (ASICs), and provides ASIC and embedded systems consulting services revolving around its processor designs. WDC also produces C compilers, assembler/linker packages, simulators, development–evaluation printed circuit boards, and in-circuit emulators for their processors.

== Hardware products ==
The first product developed by WDC was the 65C02, a CMOS version of the NMOS based MOS Technology 6502 microprocessor. Introduced in 1983, the 65C02 reduced the power consumption, improved noise immunity and added some new instructions. Apple Computer, which had previously used the 6502 in its Apple II family of computers, switched to the 65C02 for its compact Apple IIc and Enhanced Apple IIe, both introduced in 1984.

Mensch's next design, was a 65C02-compatible 16-bit microprocessor, the 65C816, (later re-designated the W65C816S). The 65C816 was designed in consultation with Apple and was adopted by them for use in the Apple IIGS computer released in 1986. The 65C816 was later chosen as the core of the Ricoh 5A22 processor that powered the Super Nintendo Entertainment System introduced in 1990.

=== Devices ===
Name	Type	Comments
W65C02S	8-bit microprocessor	Enhanced static core CMOS version of the MOS Technology 6502 microprocessor
W65C816S	16-bit microprocessor	Extended version of the W65C02S, featuring larger instruction set, selectable register sizes and 24-bit memory addressing
W65C134S	8-bit microcontroller	Microcontroller with W65C02S core and mask-programmable ROM
W65C265S	16-bit microcontroller	Microcontroller with W65C816S core and mask-programmable ROM
W65C21N	I/O device	Drop-in replacement for MOS Technology 6520 & Motorola 6820/6821 peripheral interface adapters (PIA)
W65C21S	I/O device	Lower power, higher performance version of the W65C21N PIA
W65C22N	I/O device	Drop-in replacement for the MOS Technology 6522 versatile interface adapter (VIA)
W65C22S	I/O device	Modified version of the MOS Technology 6522 VIA, with totem-pole IRQ output
W65C51N	I/O device	Drop-in replacement for the MOS Technology 6551 asynchronous communications interface adapter (ACIA)

=== Personal computer ===
The Mensch Computer is a W65C265 and W65C22-based hobbyist experimental personal computer named after company founder Bill Mensch.
