= Aix-Marseille University Faculty of Sciences =

Faculty at Aix-Marseille University

Coordinates: 43.23177°N 5.43991°E

Aix-Marseille University, Faculty of Sciences
- Université d'Aix-Marseille, Faculté des Sciences de Luminy
- Type: Public
- Established: 2012
- Affiliations: Aix-Marseille University
- Dean: Jean-Marc Pons
- Administrative staff: 4,107
- Students: 7,935
- Undergraduates: 4,940
- Postgraduates: 1,921
- Doctoral students: 1,074
- Location: Université d'Aix-Marseille; Faculté des Sciences; 3 place Victor Hugo; Case G 13331 Marseille cedex 3, Aix-en-Provence and Marseille, France
- Campus: Saint Jérôme, Château-Gombert, Montperrin, Saint Charles, Aubagne, Luminy
- Website: sciences.univ-amu.fr

Aix-Marseille University Faculty of Sciences is one of the faculties of Aix-Marseille University. The faculty is divided into seven departments across six campuses. With 8000 students and 1600 staff and faculty it is one of the largest science faculties in France.

The notable faculty include Carlo Rovelli.

== Departments ==
- Biology
- Chemistry
- Engineering
- Information systems
- Mathematics
- Physics
- SATIS : Sciences, Arts and Audiovisual

== Campuses ==
The campuses are administratively divided into three sites, Etoile, St Charles and Luminy. Etoile encompasses the campuses of Saint Jérôme, Château Gombert, and Montperrin, the only site in Aix-en-Provence. St Charles encompasses the campuses of St Charles and Aubagne.

== See also ==
- Altitude SEE Test European Platform (ASTEP), a joint research laboratory created by Aix-Marseille University, CNRS and STMicroelectronics
