= STM8 =

8-bit microcontroller family

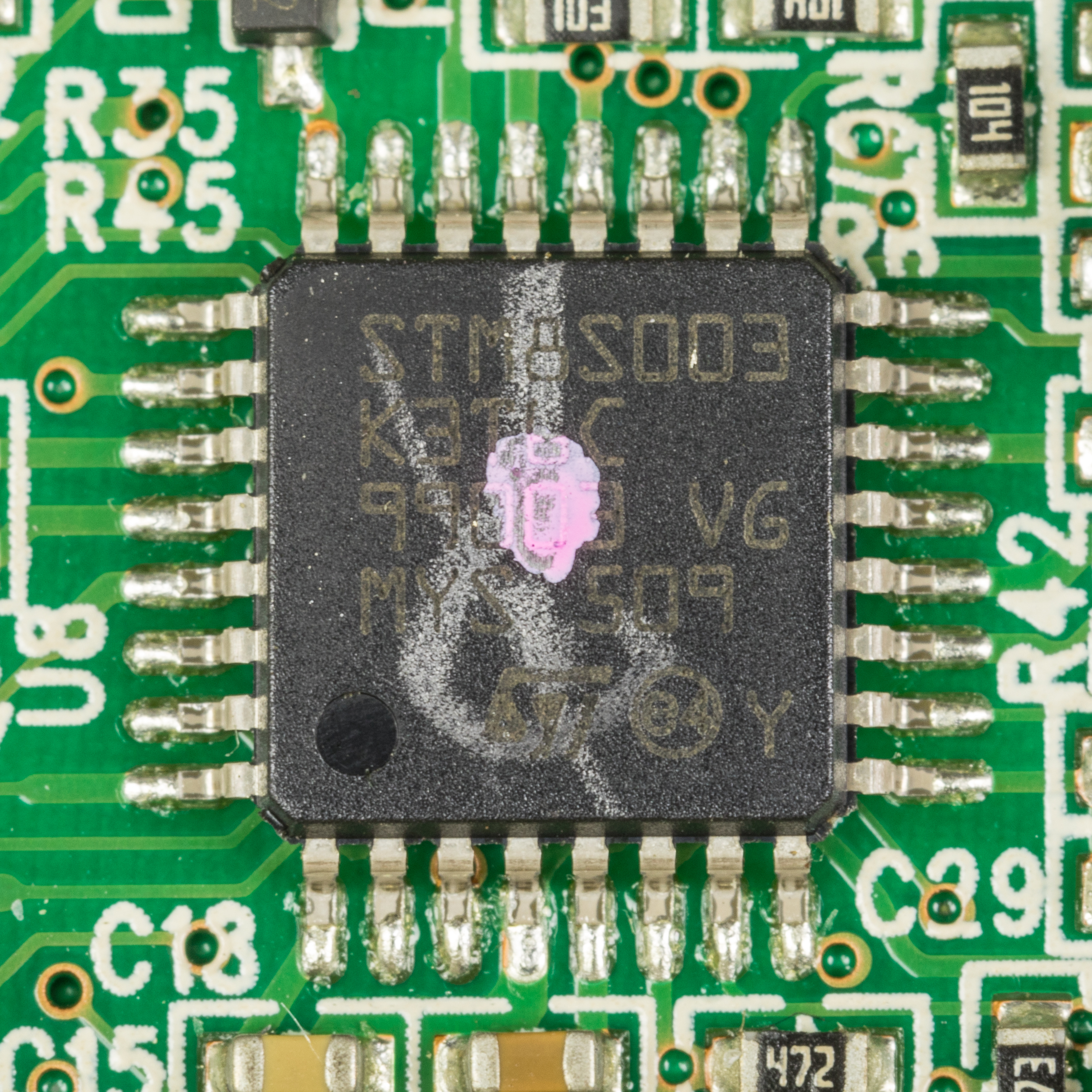
STM8S

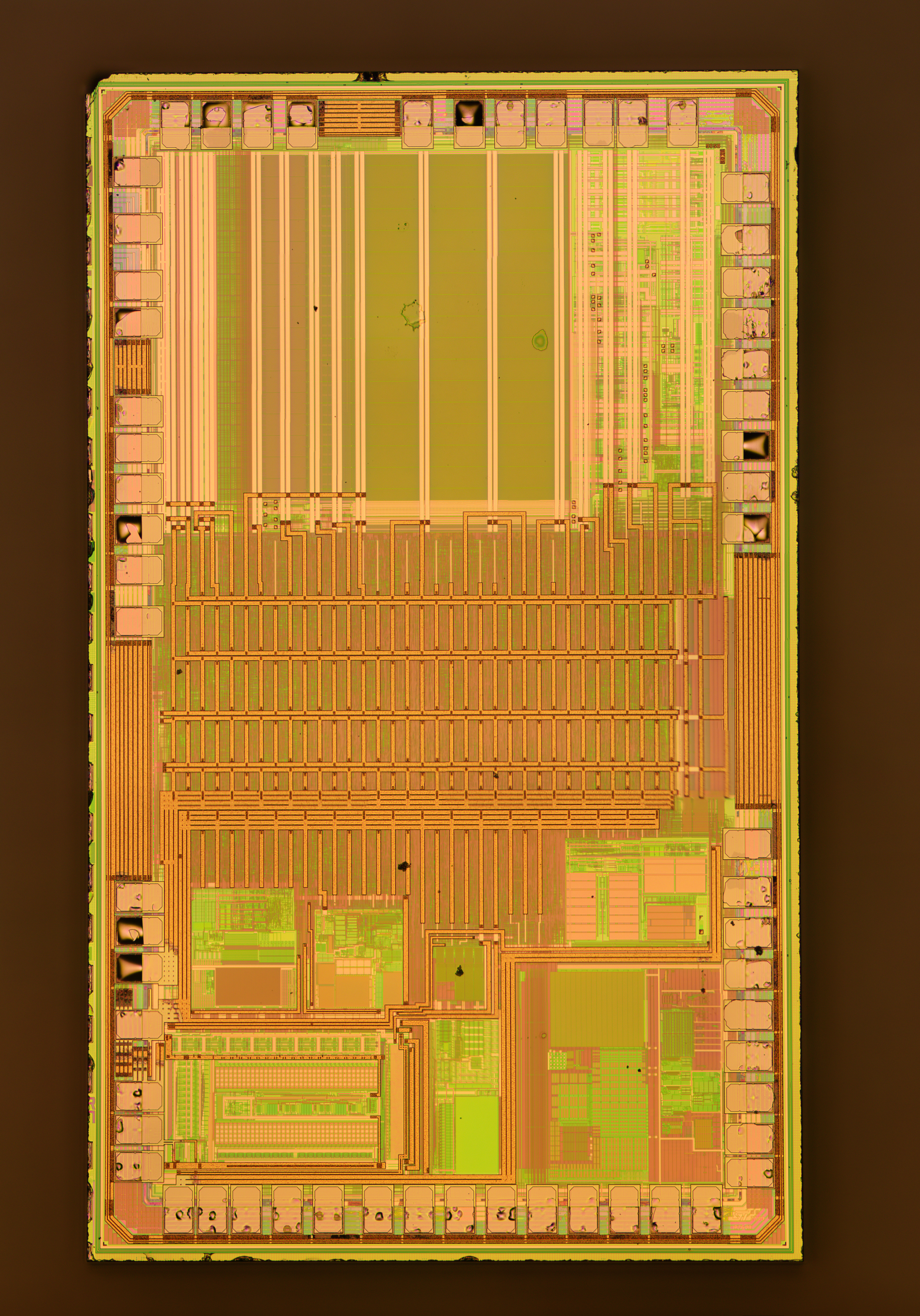
Die of the STM8L152

The STM8 is an 8-bit microcontroller family by STMicroelectronics. The STM8 microcontrollers use an extended variant of the ST7 microcontroller architecture. STM8 microcontrollers are particularly low cost for a full-featured 8-bit microcontroller.

== Architecture ==
The STM8 is very similar to the earlier ST7, but is better suited as a target for C due to its 16-bit index registers and stack pointer-relative addressing mode. Although internally a Harvard architecture it has "memory bridge" that creates a unified 24-bit address space, allowing code to execute out of RAM (useful for in-system programming of the flash ROM), and data (such as lookup tables) to be accessed out of ROM. On access the "memory bridge" stalls the CPU if required so that RAM-like write access to the flash ROM is possible. Code execution from the EEPROM is denied and creates a reset event. Random access to data above 64K is limited to special "load far" instructions; most operations' memory operands can access at most 128K (a 16-bit base address plus 16-bit offset).

Depending on the device type, the amount of RAM is in the range of 1 to 6 KiB, and the amount of ROM is 4 to 8 KiB (Low density), 16 to 32 KiB (Medium density), or 32 to 96 KiB (High density).

It has the same six registers (A, X, Y, SP, PC, CC) as the ST7, but the index registers X and Y have been expanded to 16 bits, and the program counter has been expanded to 24 bits. The accumulator A and the stack pointer remain 8 and 16 bits, respectively.

The condition code register has two more defined bits, for a total of seven. There is an overflow flag, and a second interrupt enable bit, allowing four interrupt priority levels.

== Subfamilies ==
- STM8AF automobile
- STM8AL automobile low-power
- STM8L low-power
- STM8S general purpose
- STM8T touch-sensing
- STLUX lighting control
- STNRG Pulse-width modulation-controllers

== Compiler support ==
The STM8 is supported by the open-source Small Device C Compiler, besides C there is the open-source STM8 eForth, an interactive Forth system for the STM8.

== Changes compared to ST7 ==
The STM8 instruction set is mostly a superset of the ST7's, but it is not completely binary compatible.

Operations on the X and Y registers are extended to 16 bits. Thus, loads and stores access two bytes of memory rather than one. (Also, the half-carry flag has been changed to reflect the carry from bit 7 to bit 8 of the 16-bit result, rather than the carry from bit 3 to 4.)

Interrupts push nine bytes of state instead of five as on the ST7.

The multiply instruction stores the 16-bit product in the specified index register (e.g. X), rather than dividing it between X and A.

Indirect addressing modes which fetch an 8-bit address from memory (opcodes 92 2x, 92 3x, 92 Bx, 92 6x, 92 Ex, 91 6x, and 91 Ex) have been deleted; all indirect addressing modes fetch 16-bit addresses. A new prefix byte 72 has been added, and used to encode indirect starting with a 16-bit address.

The bit manipulation instructions have been changed to take a 16-bit address and to require the 72 prefix byte. The unprefixed opcodes 0x and 1x they formerly occupied are instead used for stack-pointer relative addressing.

Some rarely used branch instructions have had their opcodes changed to require a 90 prefix, and the unprefixed opcodes reassigned to signed branches which depend on the V flag.

Load and compare instructions targeting the X register are of little use on the ST7 with addressing modes indexed by the X register. On the STM8, when such operations specify a memory operand indexed by the X register, the register operand is changed to Y. With a 90 prefix, the registers are reversed so the index register is Y and the operand register is X.

One major performance difference is that the STM8 fetches 32 bits from ROM per cycle, and many instructions take one cycle to execute. Depending in the instruction length and the number of cycles needed execution from RAM is somewhat slower. The ST7, in contrast, fetches 8 bits per cycle and takes one cycle per instruction byte.

== Instruction set ==
Most STM8 opcode bytes consist of 1 bit of type (one- or two-operand), three bits of addressing mode, and four bits of opcode. Only 6 addressing modes and 12 one-operand opcodes are assigned, leaving encoding space where other instructions are placed.

STM8 instruction overview
7	6	5	4	3	2	1	0	Description
0	mode			opcode				One-operand instructions (mode ≠ 1, 2)
0	0	0	1	opcode				Additional two-operand instructions
0	0	1	0	opcode				Conditional branches
0	opcode			0	0	0	1	Other arithmetic instructions (opcode ≠ 1, 2)
0	opcode			0	0	1	0	Other arithmetic instructions (opcode ≠ 1, 2)
0	opcode			0	1	0	1	Other arithmetic instructions (opcode ≠ 1, 2)
0	opcode			1	0	1	1	Other arithmetic instructions (opcode ≠ 1, 2)
1	mode			opcode				Two-operand instructions (mode ≠ 0, 1)
1	0	0	opcode					Miscellaneous non-arithmetic instructions

STM8 instructions consist of an optional prefix byte (72_{16}, 90_{16}, 91_{16}, or 92_{16}), an opcode byte, and a few (up to four, but rarely more than two) bytes of operands. Prefix bytes mostly modify the addressing mode used to specify the memory operand, but in some cases, prefixes 72 and 90 change the meaning of the opcode byte completely.

Prefix 90 exchanges X and Y in the following instruction. In the table below, these variants are combined on one line by writing "X/Y", which means either "X" or "Y". Prefix 90 is also used in two places to introduce new opcodes: the BCPL and BCCM instructions, and some branch conditions.

Prefix 92 converts instructions with an offset operand (addr16,X) to indirect addressing ([addr8],X). The offset is replaced by the 8-bit address of a 16-bit offset value in memory. It is used only for this function.

Prefix 91 has both of the preceding effects, converting (addr16,X) addressing modes to ([addr8],Y).

Prefix 72 is used in a number of places, in a much less regular pattern. In some cases, it introduces new addressing modes (particularly an ([addr16],X) 16-bit indirect mode), but it also introduces many completely new operations.

STM8 instruction set
Prefix	7	6	5	4	3	2	1	0	Operands	Mnemonic	Description
—	0	0	0	0	opcode				addr8	OP (addr8,SP)	One-operand instructions (see below)
—	0	0	0	1	opcode				addr8	OP A,(addr8,SP)	Two-operand instructions with stack operand
—	0	0	0	1	0	0	0	0	addr8	SUB A,(addr8,SP)	A := A − operand
—	0	0	0	1	0	0	0	1	addr8	CP A,(addr8,SP)	Compare A − operand
—	0	0	0	1	0	0	1	0	addr8	SBC A,(addr8,SP)	A := A − operand − C subtract with borrow
—	0	0	0	1	0	0	1	1	addr8	CPW X,(addr8,SP)	Compare X − operand (16-bit)
—	0	0	0	1	0	1	0	0	addr8	AND A,(addr8,SP)	A := A & operand, bitwise and
—	0	0	0	1	0	1	0	1	addr8	BCP A,(addr8,SP)	Bitwise test A & operand
—	0	0	0	1	0	1	1	0	addr8	LDW Y,(addr8,SP)	Y := operand (~~LD A,(addr8,SP)~~ assigned to opcode 7B)
—	0	0	0	1	0	1	1	1	addr8	LDW (addr8,SP),Y	Operand := Y (~~LD (addr8,SP),A~~ assigned to opcode 6B)
—	0	0	0	1	1	0	0	0	addr8	XOR A,(addr8,SP)	A := A ^ operand, exclusive-or
—	0	0	0	1	1	0	0	1	addr8	ADC A,(addr8,SP)	A := A + operand + C, add with carry
—	0	0	0	1	1	0	1	0	addr8	OR A,(addr8,SP)	A := A | operand, inclusive or
—	0	0	0	1	1	0	1	1	addr8	ADD A,(addr8,SP)	A := A + operand
—	0	0	0	1	1	1	0	0	imm16	ADDW X,#imm16	X := X + immediate (=~~JP (addr8,SP)~~)
—	0	0	0	1	1	1	0	1	imm16	SUBW X,#imm16	X := X − immediate (=~~CALL (addr8,SP)~~)
—	0	0	0	1	1	1	1	0	addr8	LDW X,(addr8,SP)	X := operand
—	0	0	0	1	1	1	1	1	addr8	LDW (addr8,SP),X	Operand := X
72/90	0	0	0	c	bit			v	operands	Bit operations	
72	0	0	0	0	bit			0	addr16 soff8	BTJT addr16,#bit,label	Jump to PC + soff8 if source bit is true (set)
72	0	0	0	0	bit			1	addr16 soff8	BTJF addr16,#bit,label	Jump to PC + soff8 if source bit is false (clear)
72	0	0	0	1	bit			0	addr16	BSET addr16,#bit	Set specified bit to 1
72	0	0	0	1	bit			1	addr16	BRES addr16,#bit	Reset (clear) specified bit to 0
90	0	0	0	1	bit			0	addr16	BCPL addr16,#bit	Complement (toggle) selected bit
90	0	0	0	1	bit			1	addr16	BCCM addr16,#bit	Write carry flag to memory bit
—/90	0	0	1	0	condition				soff8	Conditional branches (8-bit signed offset)	
—	0	0	1	0	0	0	0	0	soff8	JRA label	Branch always (true)
—	0	0	1	0	0	0	0	1	soff8	JRF label	Branch never (false)
—	0	0	1	0	0	0	1	0	soff8	JRUGT label	Branch if unsigned greater than (C=0 and Z=0)
—	0	0	1	0	0	0	1	1	soff8	JRULE label	Branch if unsigned less than or equal (C=1 or Z=1)
—	0	0	1	0	0	1	0	0	soff8	JRNC label	Branch if no carry (C=0)
—	0	0	1	0	0	1	0	1	soff8	JRC label	Branch if carry (C=1)
—	0	0	1	0	0	1	1	0	soff8	JRNE label	Branch if not equal (Z=0)
—	0	0	1	0	0	1	1	1	soff8	JREQ label	Branch if equal (Z=1)
—	0	0	1	0	1	0	0	0	soff8	JRNV label	Branch if not overflow (V=0)
90	0	0	1	0	1	0	0	0	soff8	JRNH label	Branch if not half-carry (H=0)
—	0	0	1	0	1	0	0	1	soff8	JRV label	Branch if overflow (V=1)
90	0	0	1	0	1	0	0	1	soff8	JRH label	Branch if half-carry (H=1)
—	0	0	1	0	1	0	1	0	soff8	JRPL label	Branch if plus (N=0)
—	0	0	1	0	1	0	1	1	soff8	JRMI label	Branch if minus (N=1)
—	0	0	1	0	1	1	0	0	soff8	JRSGT label	Branch if signed greater than (S=0 and N=V)
90	0	0	1	0	1	1	0	0	soff8	JRNM label	Branch if not interrupt mask (I=0)
—	0	0	1	0	1	1	0	1	soff8	JRSLE label	Branch if signed lower or equal (S=1 or N≠V)
90	0	0	1	0	1	1	0	1	soff8	JRM label	Branch if interrupts masked (I=1)
—	0	0	1	0	1	1	1	0	soff8	JRSGE label	Branch if signed greater or equal (N=V)
90	0	0	1	0	1	1	1	0	soff8	JRIL label	Branch if interrupt line is low
—	0	0	1	0	1	1	1	1	soff8	JRSLT label	Branch if signed less than (N≠V)
90	0	0	1	0	1	1	1	1	soff8	JRIH label	Branch if interrupt line is high
prefix	0	mode			opcode				operand	One-operand instructions	
—	0	0	0	0	opcode				addr8	OP (addr8,SP)	Stack pointer relative
	0	0	0	1	opcode					(reassigned to two-operand instructions with stack; see above)	
	0	0	1	0	opcode					(reassigned to conditional branches; see above)	
—	0	0	1	1	opcode				addr8	OP addr8	8-bit absolute address
72	0	0	1	1	opcode				addr16	OP [addr16]	16-bit indirect address
92	0	0	1	1	opcode				addr8	OP [addr8]	8-bit indirect address of 16-bit address
—	0	1	0	0	opcode				—	OP A	Accumulator
72/90	0	1	0	0	opcode				addr16	OP (addr16,X/Y)	Indexed with 16-bit offset
—/90	0	1	0	1	opcode				—	OPW X/Y	X/Y register (16-bit operation)
72	0	1	0	1	opcode				addr16	OP addr16	16-bit address
—/90	0	1	1	0	opcode				addr8	OP (addr8,X/Y)	8-bit address plus X/Y
72	0	1	1	0	opcode				addr16	OP ([addr16],X)	16-bit indirect address plus X
92/91	0	1	1	0	opcode				addr8	OP ([addr8],X/Y)	8-bit indirect address plus X/Y
—/90	0	1	1	1	opcode				—	OP (X/Y)	Indexed with no offset
prefix	0	mode			0	0	0	0	operand	NEG operand	Two's-complement negate
	0	mode			0	0	0	1		(reassigned to exchange operations; see following section)	
	0	mode			0	0	1	0		(reassigned to other operations; see following section)	
prefix	0	mode			0	0	1	1	operand	CPL operand	Ones' complement, logical not
prefix	0	mode			0	1	0	0	operand	SRL operand	Shift right logical, msbit cleared, lsbit to carry: (operand:C) := (0:operand)
	0	mode			0	1	0	1		(reassigned to other operations; see following section)	
prefix	0	mode			0	1	1	0	operand	RRC operand	Rotate right through carry, (operand:C) := (C:operand)
prefix	0	mode			0	1	1	1	operand	SRA operand	Shift right arithmetic, msbit preserved, lsbit to carry
prefix	0	mode			1	0	0	0	operand	SLL operand	Shift left, msbit to carry: (C:operand) := (operand:0)
prefix	0	mode			1	0	0	1	operand	RLC operand	Rotate left through carry, (C:operand) := (operand,C)
prefix	0	mode			1	0	1	0	operand	DEC operand	Decrement; N and Z set, carry unaffected
	0	mode			1	0	1	1		(reassigned to other operations; see following section)	
prefix	0	mode			1	1	0	0	operand	INC operand	Increment; N and Z set, carry unaffected
prefix	0	mode			1	1	0	1	operand	TNZ operand	Test non-zero: set N and Z based on operand value
prefix	0	mode			1	1	1	0	operand	SWAP operand	Swap halves of operand (4-bit rotate; 8-bit for SWAPW X and SWAPW Y)
prefix	0	mode			1	1	1	1	operand	CLR operand	Set operand to 0, N cleared, Z set
prefix	0	mode			opcode				operand	Reassigned opcodes [03-7][125B] from one-operand range	
—/90	0	0	0	0	0	0	0	1	—	RRWA X/Y	Rotate word right through A: 8-bit right rotate of 24-bit concatenation of X/Y and A; (X:A) := (A:X)
—	0	0	1	1	0	0	0	1	addr16	EXG A,addr16	Exchange A with memory
—	0	1	0	0	0	0	0	1	—	EXG A,XL	Exchange A with X (low half)
—	0	1	0	1	0	0	0	1	—	EXGW X,Y	Exchange X with Y (16 bits)
—	0	1	1	0	0	0	0	1	—	EXG A,YL	Exchange A with Y (low half)
—	0	1	1	1	0	0	0	1	—	(reserved)	
—/90	0	0	0	0	0	0	1	0	—	RLWA X/Y	Rotate word left through A: 8-bit left rotate of 24-bit concatenation of X/Y and A; (A:X) := (X:A)
—	0	0	1	1	0	0	1	0	addr16	POP addr16	Pop from stack
—/90	0	1	0	0	0	0	1	0	—	MUL X/Y,A	X/Y := XL/YL × A
—	0	1	0	1	0	0	1	0	imm8	SUBW SP,#imm	SP := SP − imm8
—/90	0	1	1	0	0	0	1	0	—	DIV X/Y,A	Divide X/Y by A; 16-bit quotient in X/Y, remainder in A
—	0	1	1	1	0	0	1	0	—	PREFIX	Instruction prefix 72: modify following opcode
	0	0	0	0	0	1	0	1	—	(reserved)	
—	0	0	1	1	0	1	0	1	imm8 addr16	MOV addr16,#imm8	Move immediate to memory (flags unaffected)
—	0	1	0	0	0	1	0	1	addr8 addr8	MOV addr8,addr8	Move memory to memory (flags unaffected)
—	0	1	0	1	0	1	0	1	addr16 addr16	MOV addr16,addr16	Move memory to memory (flags unaffected)
—	0	1	1	0	0	1	0	1	—	DIVW X,Y	Divide X by Y (16 bits); quotient in X, remainder in Y
	0	1	1	1	0	1	0	1	—	(reserved)	
	0	0	0	0	1	0	1	1	—	(reserved)	
—	0	0	1	1	1	0	1	1	addr16	PUSH addr16	Push onto stack
—	0	1	0	0	1	0	1	1	imm8	PUSH #imm8	Push onto stack
—	0	1	0	1	1	0	1	1	imm8	ADDW SP,#imm8	SP := SP + imm8
—	0	1	1	0	1	0	1	1	addr8	LD (addr8,SP),A	Store relative to stack
—	0	1	1	1	1	0	1	1	addr8	LD A,(addr8,SP)	Load relative to stack
—	1	0	0	opcode					—	Miscellaneous instructions. None implicitly set the condition codes.	
—	1	0	0	0	0	0	0	0	—	IRET	Return from interrupt (pop CC, A, X, Y, PC)
—	1	0	0	0	0	0	0	1	—	RET	Pop 16-bit return address from stack to PC
—	1	0	0	0	0	0	1	0	addr24	INT	Special jump for interrupt vector table
—	1	0	0	0	0	0	1	1	—	TRAP	Force trap interrupt
—	1	0	0	0	0	1	0	0	—	POP A	Pop A from stack
—/90	1	0	0	0	0	1	0	1	—	POPW X/Y	Pop X/Y from stack (16 bits)
—	1	0	0	0	0	1	1	0	—	POP CC	Pop condition codes from stack
—	1	0	0	0	0	1	1	1	—	RETF	Pop 24-bit return address from stack to PC
—	1	0	0	0	1	0	0	0	—	PUSH A	Push A onto stack
—/90	1	0	0	0	1	0	0	1	—	PUSHW X/Y	Push X/Y onto stack (16 bits)
—	1	0	0	0	1	0	1	0	—	PUSH CC	Push condition codes onto stack
—	1	0	0	0	1	0	1	1	—	BREAK	Stop for debugger if present, or NOP
—	1	0	0	0	1	1	0	0	—	CCF	Complement (toggle) carry flag
—	1	0	0	0	1	1	0	1	addr24	CALLF addr24	Push 24-bit PC; PC := addr24
92	1	0	0	0	1	1	0	1	addr16	CALLF [addr16]	Indirect far call; address is of 24-bit pointer
—	1	0	0	0	1	1	1	0	—	HALT	Halt processor and clocks
—	1	0	0	0	1	1	1	1	—	WFI	Wait for interrupt, halting processor but not clocks
72	1	0	0	0	1	1	1	1	—	WFE	Wait for event (coprocessor), handling interrupts normally while waiting
—	1	0	0	1	0	0	0	0	—	PDY	Instruction prefix 90: swap X and Y in next instruction
—	1	0	0	1	0	0	0	1	—	PIY	Instruction prefix 91: PDY plus PIX
—	1	0	0	1	0	0	1	0	—	PIX	Instruction prefix 92: use 8-bit memory indirect for operand
—/90	1	0	0	1	0	0	1	1	—	LDW X/Y,Y/X	X/Y := Y/X
—/90	1	0	0	1	0	1	0	0	—	LDW SP,X/Y	SP := X/Y
—/90	1	0	0	1	0	1	0	1	—	LD XH/YH,A	XH/YH := A
—/90	1	0	0	1	0	1	1	0	—	LDW X/Y,SP	X/Y := SP
—/90	1	0	0	1	0	1	1	1	—	LD XL/YL,A	XL/YL := A
—	1	0	0	1	1	0	0	0	—	RCF	Reset (clear) carry flag
—	1	0	0	1	1	0	0	1	—	SCF	Set carry flag
—	1	0	0	1	1	0	1	0	—	RIM	Reset interrupt mask (enable interrupts)
—	1	0	0	1	1	0	1	1	—	SIM	Set interrupt mask (disable interrupts)
—	1	0	0	1	1	1	0	0	—	RVF	Reset (clear) overflow flag
—	1	0	0	1	1	1	0	1	—	NOP	No operation
—/90	1	0	0	1	1	1	1	0	—	LD A,XH/YH	A := XH/YH
—/90	1	0	0	1	1	1	1	1	—	LD A,XL/YL	A := XL/YL
Prefix	1	mode			opcode				operand	Two-operand instructions A := A op operand	
—	0	0	0	0	opcode				addr8	OP A,(addr8,SP)	(opcodes 6, 7, C, D differ; see above)
—	1	0	0	opcode						(reassigned to miscellaneous instructions; see above)	
—	1	0	1	0	opcode				imm8	OP A,#imm8	8-bit immediate operand (forbidden as destination)
—	1	0	1	1	opcode				addr8	OP A,addr8	8-bit absolute address (forbidden for jump/call)
—	1	1	0	0	opcode				addr16	OP A,addr16	16-bit absolute address
72	1	1	0	0	opcode				addr16	OP A,[addr16]	16-bit indirect address
92	1	1	0	0	opcode				addr8	OP A,[addr8]	8-bit indirect address of 16-bit address
—/90	1	1	0	1	opcode				addr16	OP A,(addr16,X/Y)	Indexed with 16-bit offset
72	1	1	0	1	opcode				addr16	OP A,([addr16],X)	16-bit indirect + X
92/91	1	1	0	1	opcode				addr16	OP A,([addr8],X/Y)	8-bit indirect + X/Y
—/90	1	1	1	0	opcode				addr8	OP A,(addr8,X/Y)	Indexed with 8-bit offset
—/90	1	1	1	1	opcode				—	OP A,(X/Y)	Indexed with no offset
prefix	1	mode			0	0	0	0	operand	SUB A,operand	A := A − operand
prefix	1	mode			0	0	0	1	operand	CP A,operand	Compare A − operand
prefix	1	mode			0	0	1	0	operand	SBC A,operand	A := A − operand − C subtract with borrow
prefix	1	mode			0	0	1	1	operand	CPW X/Y,operand	Compare X/Y − operand (16 bit); compare Y/X if operand mode is indexed by X/Y (opcodes D3, E3, F3)
prefix	1	mode			0	1	0	0	operand	AND A,operand	A := A & operand, bitwise and
prefix	1	mode			0	1	0	1	operand	BCP A,operand	Bitwise test A & operand
prefix	1	mode			0	1	1	0	operand	LD A,operand	A := operand
prefix	1	mode			0	1	1	1	operand	LD operand,A	Operand := A (mode 2 ~~LD #imm8,A~~ reassigned, see below)
prefix	1	mode			1	0	0	0	operand	XOR A,operand	A := A ^ operand, exclusive-or
prefix	1	mode			1	0	0	1	operand	ADC A,operand	A := A + operand + C, add with carry
prefix	1	mode			1	0	1	0	operand	OR A,operand	A := A | operand, inclusive or
prefix	1	mode			1	0	1	1	operand	ADD A,operand	A := A + operand
prefix	1	mode			1	1	0	0	operand	JP operand	Low 16 bits of PC := operand, unconditional jump (modes 2 ~~JP #imm8~~ and 3 ~~JP addr8~~ reassigned, see below)
prefix	1	mode			1	1	0	1	operand	CALL operand	Push 16-bit PC, low 16 bits of PC := operand (modes 2 ~~CALL #imm8~~ and 3 ~~CALL addr8~~ reassigned, see below)
prefix	1	mode			1	1	1	0	operand	LDW X/Y,operand	Load X/Y := operand; use 16 instead of 90 1E for LDW Y,(addr8,SP)
prefix	1	mode			1	1	1	1	operand	LDW operand,X/Y	Operand := X/Y (16-bit, mode 2 ~~LD #imm8,X~~ reassigned, see below); store Y/X if operand mode is indexed by X/Y (opcodes DF, EF, FF); use 17 instead of 90 1F for LDW (addr8,SP),Y
Prefix	1	mode			opcode				operand	Reassigned opcodes A7, AC, BC, AD, BD, AF from two-operand range	
—/90	1	0	1	0	0	1	1	1	addr24	LDF (addr24,X/Y),A	Load far (=~~LD #imm8,A~~)
92/91	1	0	1	0	0	1	1	1	addr16	LDF ([addr16],X/Y),A	16-bit address of 24-bit pointer
—	1	0	1	0	1	1	0	0	addr24	JPF addr24	PC := addr24 (=~~JP #imm8~~)
92	1	0	1	0	1	1	0	0	addr16	JPF [addr16]	Indirect far jump; address is of 24-bit pointer
—	1	0	1	1	1	1	0	0	addr24	LDF A,addr24	Load far (=~~JP addr8~~)
92	1	0	1	1	1	1	0	0	addr16	LDF A,[addr16]	Load far, 16-bit address of 24-bit pointer
—	1	0	1	0	1	1	0	1	soff8	CALLR label	Push 16-bit PC, PC := PC + operand (=~~CALL #imm8~~)
—	1	0	1	1	1	1	0	1	addr24	LDF addr24,A	Operand := A (=~~CALL addr8~~)
92	1	0	1	1	1	1	0	1	addr16	LDF [addr16],A	Operand := A, 16-bit address of 24-bit pointer
—/90	1	0	1	0	1	1	1	1	addr24	LDF A,(addr24,X/Y)	Load far (=~~LDW #imm8,X~~)
92/91	1	0	1	0	1	1	1	1	addr16	LDF A,([addr16],X/Y)	16-bit address of 24-bit pointer
72	1	mode			opcode				operand	Index register arithmetic (16-bit) X/Y := X/Y ± operand	
72	1	0	1	0	opcode				imm16	OPW X/Y,#imm16	16-bit immediate
72	1	0	1	1	opcode				addr16	OPW X/Y,addr16	16-bit absolute
72	1	1	1	1	opcode				addr8	OPW X/Y,(addr8,SP)	Stack-relative
72	1	mode			0	0	0	0	operand	SUBW X,operand	X := X − operand (prefer opcode 1D for SUBW X,#imm16)
72	1	mode			0	0	1	0	operand	SUBW Y,operand	Y := Y − operand
72	1	mode			1	0	0	1	operand	ADDW Y,operand	Y := Y + operand
72	1	mode			1	0	1	1	operand	ADDW X,operand	X := X + operand (prefer opcode 1C for ADDW X,#imm16)

For CPW and LDW instructions where the operand addressing mode is indexed by X, the STM8 uses the Y register by default instead of X. Applying a 90 prefix exchanges X and Y so the register is X and the addressing mode is indexed by Y.
