= Anglia Components =

Electronics company

Anglia
- Type: Plc
- Industry: Electronics
- Founded: 1972
- Founder: Bill Ingram
- Headquarters: Wisbech, Cambridgeshire, UK
- Key people: Steve Rawlins - Chief Executive Officer; John Bowman - Marketing Director
- Products: Electronic components - Semiconductors, Optoelectronics, Interconnects, Passives, Electromechanical
- Website: www.anglia-live.com

Anglia Components Plc is the UK's largest privately owned independent authorised distributor of electronic components trading under the name Anglia. A signatory of the ADS SC21 programme, Anglia holds AS9120, ISO9001 & ISO14001 accreditation.

== History ==
Anglia was founded in 1972 by Bill Ingram, who started the business from home as a sole trader. The initial operation was established to provide spare parts to the radio and TV repair trade. As Anglia developed, it moved to premises in Burdett Road, Wisbech, Cambridgeshire, UK. By 1980, Anglia had grown significantly and directed its efforts towards the electronics manufacturing industry.

The signing of distribution agreements and the launch of direct product brands throughout the 1980s resulted in Anglia holding much more extensive inventory. It moved to a new distribution centre and offices on a 2-acre site in Sandall Road, Wisbech, Cambridgeshire, UK during 1992, where Anglia remains today.

The late 1990s and early 2000s saw considerable expansion at Anglia, of its supplier line card and product portfolio. During this period, Anglia created specialist divisions to develop emerging technologies and set up a logistics and distribution operation in Hong Kong.

In 2011, Steve Rawlins (CEO) reached agreement with the majority shareholder Bill Ingram to purchase the remainder of Anglia's shares thereby securing Anglia's position as the UK's largest privately owned distributor. The transfer of ownership was completed in 2019 without the use of any external funding.

At the beginning of 2013 the company launched Anglia-Live, its e-commerce website, offering a comprehensive parametric search engine, live inventory, live pricing and online ordering. In more recent times, Anglia has signed numerous distribution agreements with major semiconductor suppliers significantly enhancing its product profile whilst continuing to receive multiple awards from its principle suppliers.

During 2022 Anglia embarked on a major £2M expansion of its distribution centre in Cambridgeshire UK, increasing the capacity of the site by 40%; the expanded facility was opened officially on 31 January 2023 by dignitaries from one of Anglia's major supply partners STMicroelectronics. Following the distribution centre expansion, in November 2023 Anglia announced the opening up of its eCommerce platform www.anglia-live.com to customers across the EU, its wide product range is now offered with 2-day DDP delivery across all 27 EU member states.

== Recognition ==
On Sunday 26 April 2020 Anglia ranked for the first time on the 21st annual Sunday Times Profit Track based on its financial performance over the previous three years. In 2021 Anglia launched a dedicated division called Anglia Unicorn. which focuses on offering support for Technology Startups and Investors.

In 2023 Anglia appeared on the inaugural Sunday Times Best Places to Work list powered by WorkL, the company was listed under the Medium Organisation category.

In 2024 Anglia appeared at position 32 in the Global Top 50 Electronics Distributors list compiled by Supply Chain Connect, the only privately owned UK distributor to make it onto the list.
