= ST6 =

ST6 may refer to:

- ST6 and ST7, 8-bit microcontroller product lines from STMicroelectronics
- ST6, a postcode district in the Stoke-on-Trent postcode area
- ST6, a variant of the Pratt & Whitney Canada PT6 turboprop aircraft engine
- ST6, the Finance and Investment Specialist Technical B examination of the Institute of Actuaries
- ST6, the last of the KX series of telephone boxes in the United Kingdom

== See also ==
- Star Trek VI: The Undiscovered Country, a 1991 American science fiction film
