= Società Generale Semiconduttori =

Defunct Italian semiconductor manufacturer

- Type: Public
- Industry: Semiconductor industry
- Founded: 1957; 69 years ago
- Founder: Olivetti and Telettra
- Defunct: 1987
- Fate: merged with Semiconductor branch of Thomson SA
- Successor: STMicroelectronics
- Headquarters: Agrate Brianza, Lombardy, Italy
- Area served: Europe, Americas, Asia–Pacific

SGS (Italian: Società Generale Semiconduttori, lit. 'General Semiconductor Company') was an Italian manufacturer of semiconductor devices, most notably diodes, transistors and DIP ICs.

== History ==
In 1957, Mario Tchou, an engineer from Olivetti, convinced Adriano Olivetti to found an Italian electronic manufacturing company for production of solid-state electronic devices. Olivetti sent his son Roberto Olivetti and Mario Tchou to negotiate with Virgilio Floriani, president of Telettra, to establish a joint venture. Within the same year, Olivetti and Telettra founded Società Generale Semiconduttori (SGS). One of the reasons for SGS's foundation was the need of parts (diodes and transistors in particular) for Elea, a mainframe that was being developed by Olivetti. The headquarters of the company was located in Agrate Brianza.

In 1960, Fairchild Semiconductor acquired one third of the company and a joint venture called SGS-Fairchild was formed. That gave SGS access to Fairchild's newly invented planar manufacturing technology. The partnership ended in 1968 and Fairchild sold its SGS stocks to IRI-STET, predecessor of TIM.

In December 1971, SGS merged with another Italian semiconductor company, Aquila Tubi e Semiconduttori (ATES) to form SGS-ATES. On 23 April 1985, the company changes its name to SGS Microelettronica. By the mid-1980s, SGS had come under considerable pressure from multiple larger American competitors, including Texas Instruments and Motorola.

During 1987, SGS Microelettronica merged with the France's Thomson Semiconductors (the semiconductor division of Thomson) to form SGS-Thomson Microelectronics (STM), which subsequently rebranded as STMicroelectronics in 1998. The motivation for this cross-border merger derived from both political and economic sources; the creation of the Geneva-based STM in place of two smaller national semiconductor manufacturers, politicians in both France and Italy sought to create a more powerful European corpoeration that could stand up against American dominance of the industry, and even prevent Europe from greater dependence on imported technology. Furthermore, both SGS and Thomson had already cooperated in some areas, including a strategic alliance to develop and produce non-volatile memory.

== See also ==
- Leonardo
- Zilog
- Mostek
- Thomson-CSF
