= ST7 (disambiguation) =

ST7 is the suppressor of tumorigenicity protein 7 and gene.

ST7 may also refer to:

- Star Trek VII (1994 film), the science fiction film Star Trek Generations
- STMicroelectronics ST7, a microcontroller, see ST6 and ST7
- ST7 postcode, a postcode for the Stoke-on-Trent, England, UK, area; see ST postcode area
