= ASTEP =

ASTEP may refer to:

- Astrobiology Science and Technology for Exploring Planets, a former NASA program focused on planetary exploration
- Antarctic Search for Transiting ExoPlanets, a European 40 cm telescope active at the Concordia Research Station
- Altitude SEE Test European Platform, a permanent mountain laboratory in the French Alps
