= Quintauris =

- Company type: Joint venture
- Industry: Information technology
- Founded: December 22, 2023; 2 years ago
- Headquarters: Munich, Germany
- Key people: Alexander Kocher (CEO)
- Products: Semiconductors
- Owner: Bosch, Infineon, Nordic Semiconductor, NXP, Qualcomm, STMicroelectronics
- Website: quintauris.eu

Quintauris is a European joint company specialized in development of RISC-V based technologies. Currently located in Germany, the company aims to support and standardize RISC-V commercially.

== History ==
On August 4, 2023, 5 semiconductor companies Robert Bosch GmbH, Infineon Technologies AG, Nordic Semiconductor, NXP Semiconductors, and Qualcomm Technologies, Inc. have announced the foundation of a joint company aimed at advancing the adoption of RISC-V as an ISA, commercializing it and setting industry standards. The company has been formally established and dubbed Quintauris on 22 December of the same year. On 29 August 2024, STMicroelectronics announced they join Quintauris as the sixth shareholder.

== See also ==
- European Processor Initiative
- SiFive
- lowRISC
