= Real-time Neutron Monitor Database =

Cosmic-ray monitor database

The Real-time Neutron Monitor Database (or NMDB) is a worldwide network of standardized neutron monitors, used to record variations of the primary cosmic rays. The measurements complement space-based cosmic ray measurements.

Unlike data from satellite experiments, neutron monitor data has never been available in high resolution from many stations in real-time. The data is often only available from the individual stations website, in varying formats, and not in real-time. To overcome this deficit, the European Commission is supporting the Real-time Neutron Monitor Database (NMDB) as an e-Infrastructures project in the Seventh Framework Programme in the Capacities section. Stations that do not have 1-minute resolution will be supported by the development of an affordable standard registration system that will submit the measurements to the database via the internet in real-time. This resolves the problem of different data formats and for the first time allows to use real-time cosmic ray measurements for space weather predictions (Steigies, Klein et al.)

Besides creating a database and developing applications working with this data, a part of the project is dedicated to create a public outreach website to inform about cosmic rays and possible effects on humans, technological systems, and the environment (Mavromichalaki et al.)

== See also ==
- Altitude SEE Test European Platform (ASTEP)
