= Mostek =

American electronics company

Mostek Corporation
- Mostek logo from the late 1970s until its acquisition by United Technologies
- Industry: Semiconductors
- Founded: 1969; 57 years ago in Worcester, Massachusetts
- Founder: L. J. Sevin; Louay E. Sharif; Richard L. Petritz
- Defunct: 1985
- Fate: Merged into STMicroelectronics

Mostek Corporation was a semiconductor integrated circuit manufacturer, founded in 1969 by L. J. Sevin, Louay E. Sharif, Richard L. Petritz and other ex-employees of Texas Instruments. At its peak in the late 1970s, Mostek held an 85% market share of the dynamic random-access memory (DRAM) memory chip market worldwide, until being eclipsed by lower-priced Japanese DRAM manufacturers who were accused of dumping memory on the market.

In 1979, soon after its market peak, Mostek was purchased by United Technologies Corporation for US$345M. In 1985, after several years of red ink and declining market share, UTC closed Mostek completely and sold it for US$71M to the French electronics firm Thomson-CSF, which later spun it off into STMicroelectronics.

== Early products ==
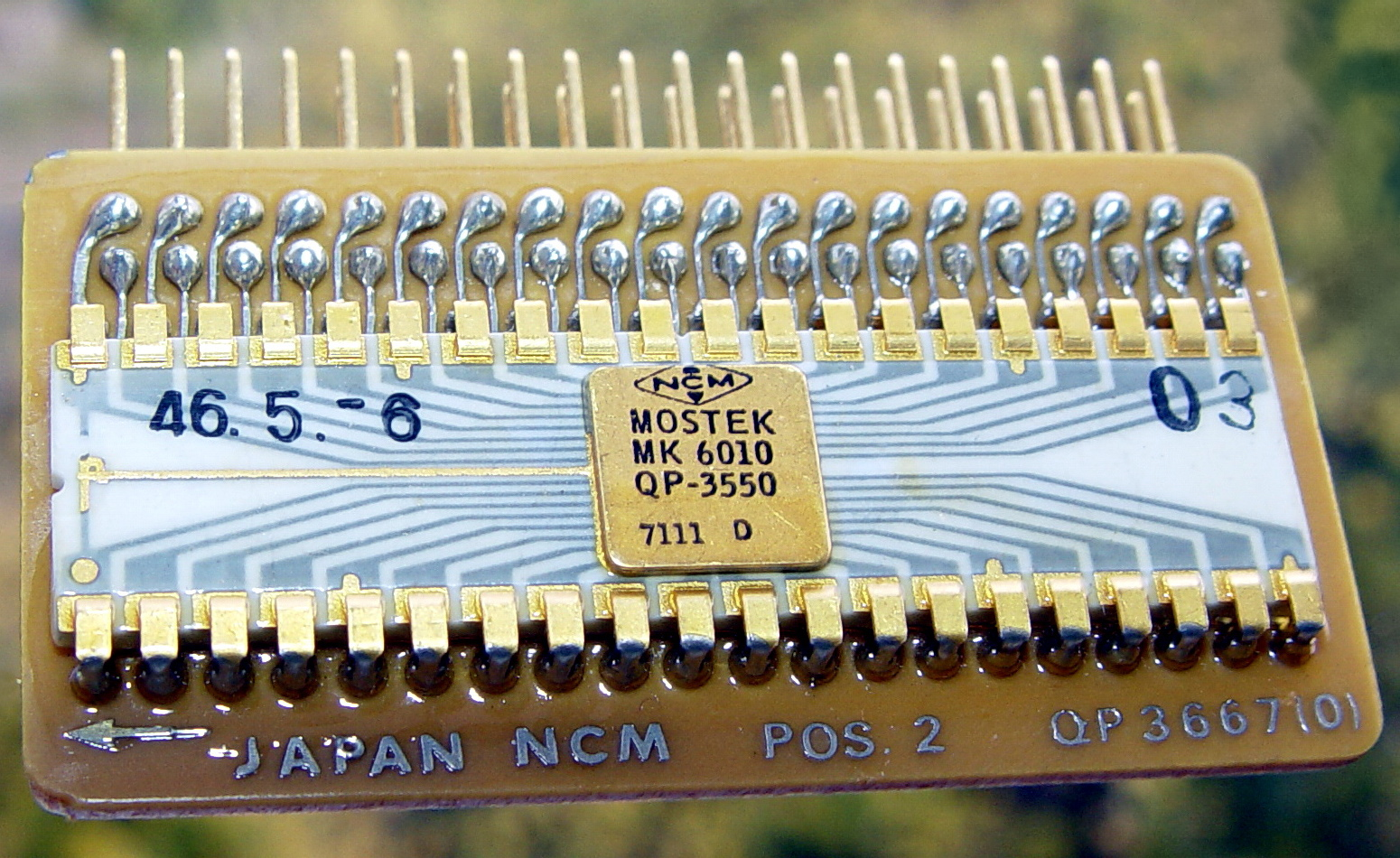
World's 1st Single-Chip Calculator

Mostek's first contract was from Burroughs, a $400 contract for circuit design. Initially Mostek products were manufactured in Worcester, Massachusetts in cooperation with Sprague Electric, however by 1974 most of its manufacturing was done at their headquarters in Carrollton, Texas. The first design to be produced was the MK1001, a simple barrel shifter chip made using an aluminium-gate PMOS process. This was followed by a 1K DRAM, the MK4006, designed by Vern McKinney, that was manufactured in their Carrollton facility.

Mostek had been working with Sprague Electric to develop the ion implantation process which provided much better control of doping profiles, especially in lowering enhancement-mode transistor threshold voltage and providing depletion-load transistors. Using ion implantation, Mostek became an early leader in MOS manufacturing technology, while their competition was still mostly using the older bipolar technology. The resulting increased speed and lower cost of the MK4006 memory chip made it the runaway favorite to IBM and other mainframe and minicomputer manufacturers (cf. BUNCH, Digital Equipment Corporation).

In 1970 Busicom, a Japanese adding machine manufacturer, approached Intel and Mostek with a proposal to introduce a new electronic calculator line. Intel responded first, providing them with the Intel 4004, which they used in a line of desktop calculators. Mostek's device took longer to develop but was the world's first single chip calculator, the MK6010, used for the Busicom LE-120A which went on the market in 1971 and was the smallest calculator available for some time. Hewlett-Packard also contracted with Mostek for design and production of chips for their HP-35 and HP-45 calculators.

Mostek's product line included telephone tone and pulse dialers, touchtone decoders, counters, top-octave generators (used by Hammond, Baldwin, and others), CODECs, watch circuits, and a host of custom products for a variety of customers. The products used the simple aluminium-gate PMOS (& later aluminium-gate CMOS) process and helped maintain Mostek's cash flow through intense DRAM competition, and other semiconductor market pressures. In 1975 a smoky fire in the wafer fab closed it for several months and production of some critical products was shifted to a friendly fab (Synertek) in Silicon Valley.

== DRAM ==
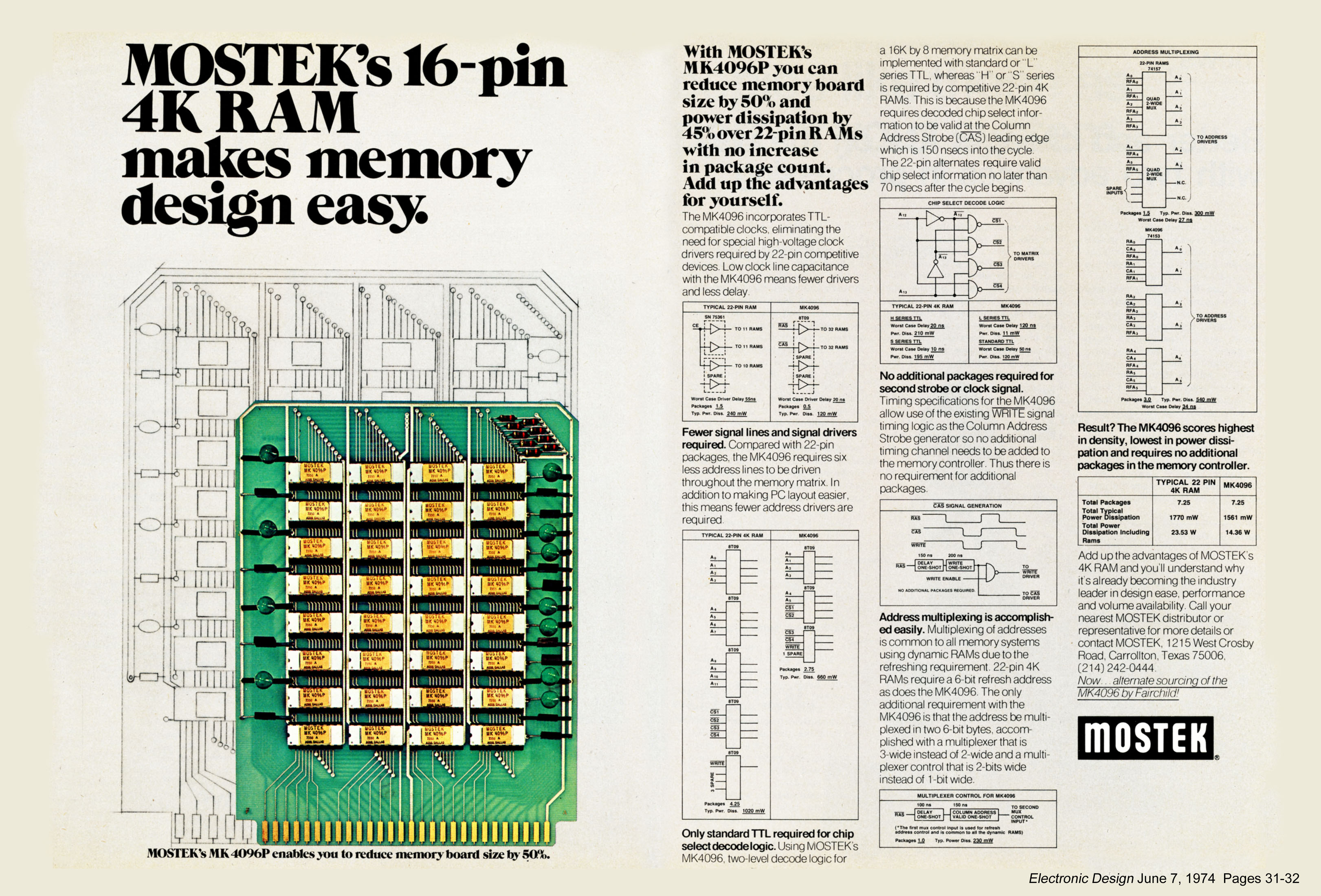
MOSTEK 4K dynamic RAM advertisement in 1974 issue of Electronic Design Magazine

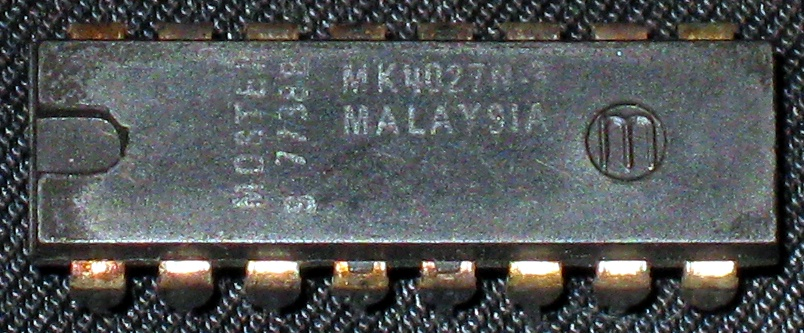
First multiplexed Si-gate DRAM, the Mostek MK4027N. 1977 date code.

Mostek co-founder Robert Proebsting invented DRAM address multiplexing with the MK4096 4096 X 1 bit DRAM introduced in 1973. Address multiplexing reduced cost and board space by fitting a 4K DRAM into a 16 pin DIP package, while competitors used a bulky and relatively expensive 22 pin package. Competitors derided the Mostek approach as unnecessarily complex, but Proebsting understood the future roadmap for DRAM memories would benefit greatly if only one new pin were needed for every 4X increase in memory size, instead of the two pins per 4X for the evolutionary approach.

Computer manufacturers found address multiplexing to be a compelling feature as they saw that a future 64K DRAM chip would save 8 pins if implemented with address multiplexing and subsequent generations even more. Per pin costs are a major cost driver in integrated circuits, plus the multiplexed approach used less silicon area, which further reduces chip cost. The MK4096 was produced using an NMOS aluminum-gate process with an added interconnect layer of polysilicon (dubbed the SPIN process). The fear, uncertainty and doubt put up by the competition regarding address multiplexing was dispelled by the actual performance of the MK4096 which proved solid and robust in all types of computer memory designs.

In 1976 Mostek introduced the silicon-gate MK4027 (an improved version of the metal-gated MK4096), and in 1977 the MK4116 16K double-poly silicon-gate DRAM designed by Paul Schroeder and Robert Proebsting (Schroeder later left Mostek to co-found Inmos). The MK4116 achieved greater than 75% worldwide DRAM market share. The MK4027 and MK4116 were reverse-engineered by MOSAID and successfully cloned by many companies, both USA and overseas-based.

The 64K generation of DRAMs required a transition from 12V & +/−5V to 5V-only operation, in order to free the +12V and −5V pins for use as addresses (the +5V and ground pins were assigned to pins 8 and 16, respectively, rather than the 16-pin TTL DIP standard of pin 8 for ground and pin 16 for +5V). While most competitors took a conservative approach by simply shrinking (scaling) their 64Ks, Mostek undertook a major redesign which incorporated forward-looking features (such as controlled pre-charge current) that were not necessary at the 64K level and delayed entry into the market.

Mostek's DRAM legacy is exemplified in the MK4116, MK4164 and MK41256. "By four" DRAM was a simple adaptation of the MK4116/MK4164/MK41256 technology, utilizing a larger package to accommodate the additional data bits and multiplexing the data in/out pins as well; the basic *RAS, *CAS, *WRITE and multiplexed address bus concept was retained intact.

== Microprocessor second sourcing deals ==
With this foundation in calculator chips and high volume DRAM production, Mostek gained a reputation as a leading semiconductor "fabrication house" (fab) in the early 1970s.

=== MK5065 ===
In 1974 Mostek introduced the MK5065, an 8-bit PMOS microprocessor, with 51 instructions whose execution times range from 3 to 16 μs. Architectural features included multiple nested indirect addressing and three register sets (each consisting of an accumulator, a program counter and a carry/link bit) which could be used for interrupt processing or for subroutines. Bill Mensch was one of the engineers who had actually designed the 5065 at Motorola for Olivetti.

=== MK3870 ===
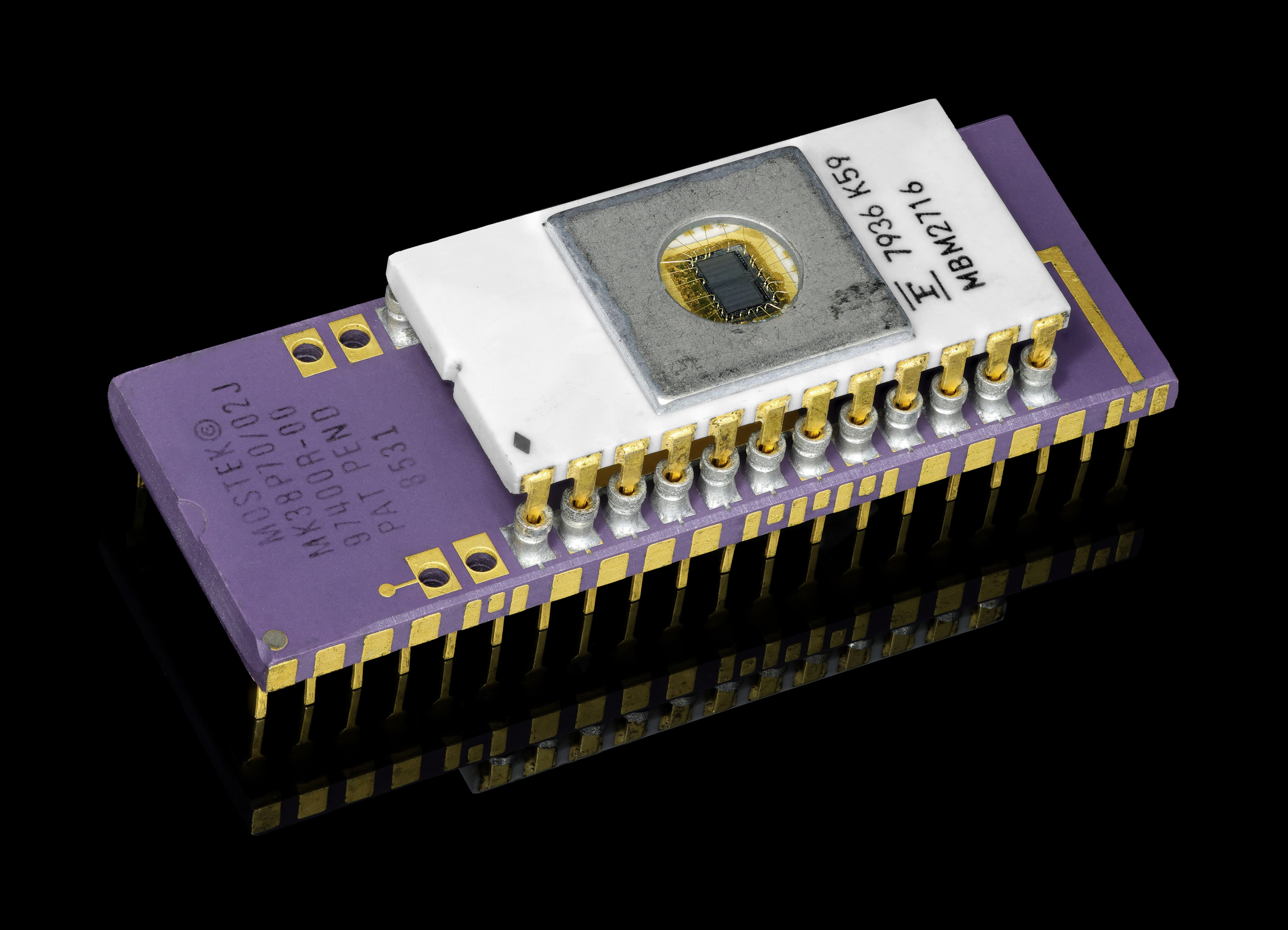
Mostek MK38P70 piggyback microcontroller variant of the MK3870

A more popular product was the MK3870, which combined the two-chip Fairchild F8 (3850 + 3851) into a single chip, introduced in 1977. William Bradley designed a host of custom products based on the 3870. Fairchild later licensed the 3870 back from Mostek. Mostek also produced ROM chips on demand, as well as the chips powering the Hammond electronic organ.

=== MK3880(Z80) ===
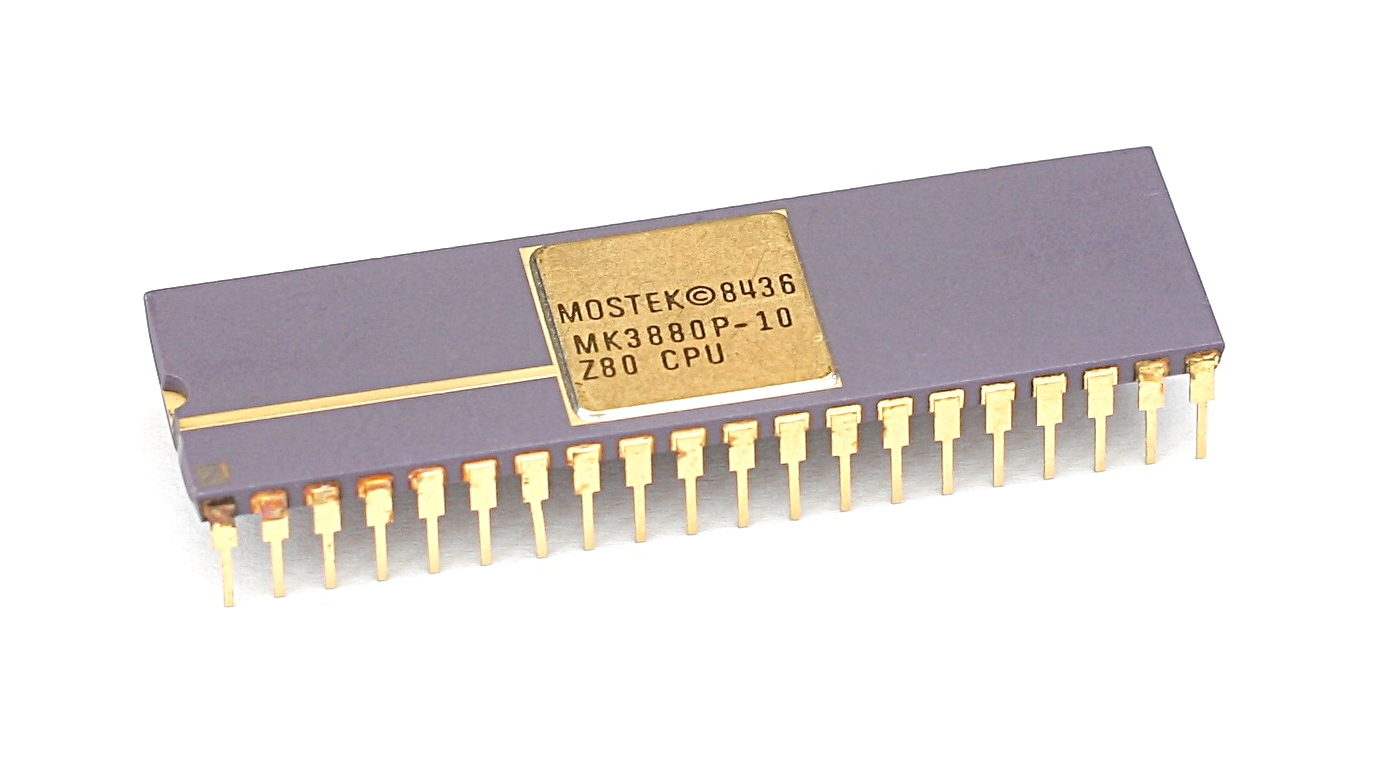
Mostek MK3880P (Zilog Z80)

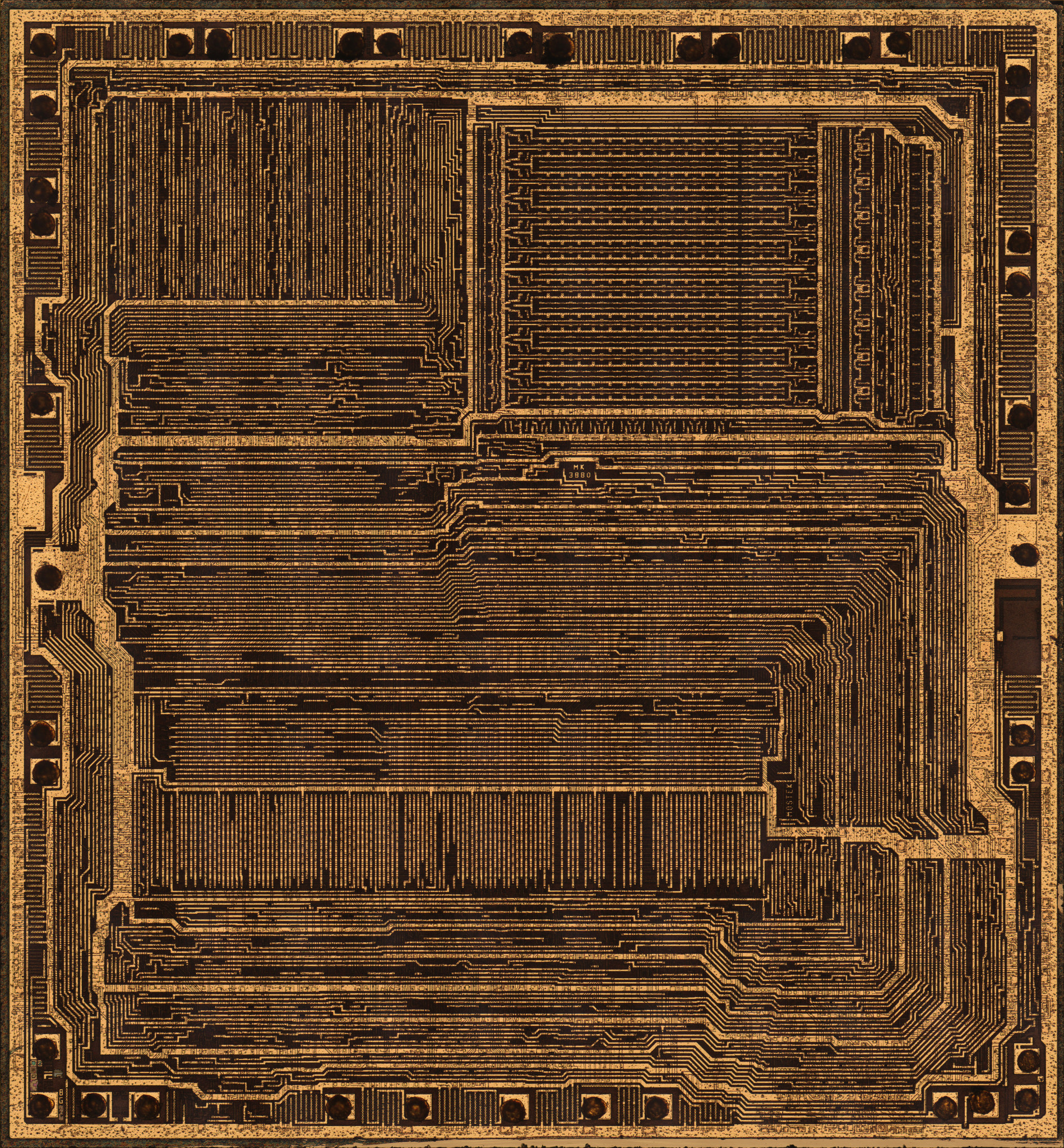
– metal layer

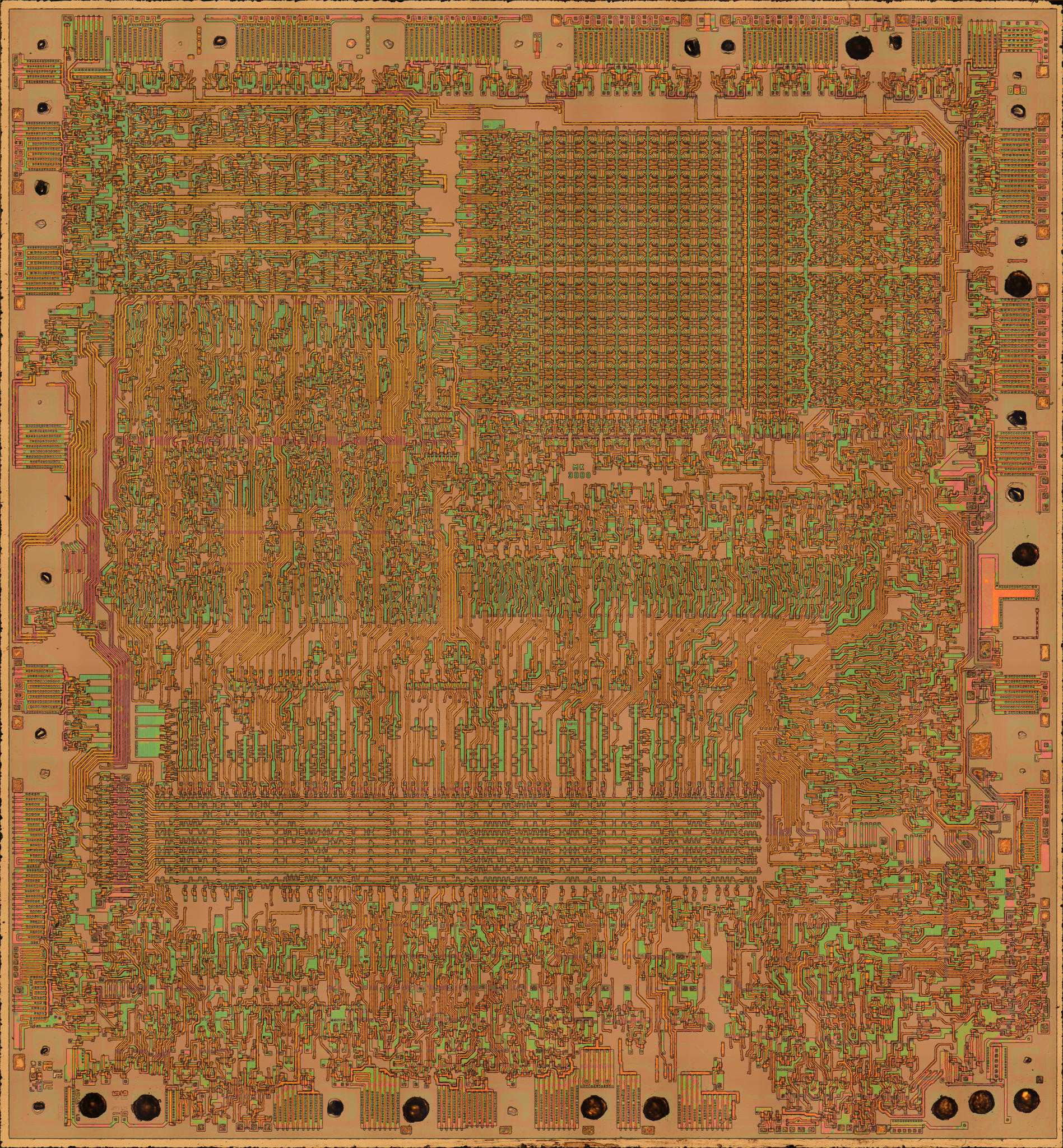
– silicon only

Mostek MK3880 (Zilog Z80) die

During the introduction of the Z80, Zilog needed a production partner while they got their own fabs set up. They first signed a production agreement with Synertek, but the company later demanded they sign a second source deal, allowing Synertek to produce and sell the design on their own. Zilog refused, so the agreement was broken. Zilog then selected Mostek as the only other company capable of building a +5V device (as opposed to +5 and +12). Mostek had developed advanced layout methods which were applied to the Z80, resulting in the device being shrunk by 20%. Mostek was able to sign a second source deal for what it called the MK3880. The Z80 eventually became the most popular microcomputer family, and was used in millions of embedded devices as well as in many home computers and computers using the de facto standard CP/M operating system, such as the Osborne, Kaypro, and TRS-80 models. (Note: Older note left in: Mostek supposedly discovered that Zilog had modified the recipe for Z80 chips to keep the yields low, thereby buying Zilog time to build their own fabs.)

=== Others ===
Mostek sought new microprocessor partners and negotiated deals with Intel to gain second sourcing rights to the Intel 8086 microprocessor family and future x86 designs and with Motorola for rights to the Motorola 68000 and VME. Mostek thus secured rights to every microprocessor family that would be important for the next 25 years. The Intel x86 microprocessors would go on to become the brains for the IBM PC, while the Motorola 68000 would become the heart of the Apple Macintosh line. However, as with its telecom business, Mostek chose not to aggressively follow-up its entry into microprocessors—instead increasing its concentration on DRAMs.

== Decline in the face of Asian competition ==
Mostek was bought by United Technologies (UTC) in 1979 for US$345M to prevent an unfriendly takeover from Gould at the 10th anniversary of the company's founding, when a large block of stock options controlled by Sprague Electric became vested. The leadership UTC chose for its semiconductor division did not appreciate the up-front investment required or the long time for ROI.

UTC at first invested hundreds of millions to expand Mostek, then hundreds of millions more trying to keep the company going during the various semiconductor and videogame crashes of the early 1980s. UTC sacrificed Mostek's leadership position in some markets, focusing instead on the highly competitive (and eventually unprofitable) DRAM business.

Unfortunately the DRAM marketplace was the beachhead where Japanese firms would make their successful assault on the global semiconductor market. In 1985, when 64K DRAM memory chips were the most common memory chips used in computers, and when more than 60 percent of those chips were produced by Japanese companies, semiconductor makers in the United States (including Mostek spin-off Micron) accused Japanese companies of export dumping for the purpose of driving makers in the United States out of the commodity memory chip business. Prices for the 64K product plummeted to as low as 35 cents apiece from $3.50 within 18 months, with disastrous financial consequences for U.S. chip makers. On 4 December 1985 the US Commerce Department’s International Trade Administration ruled in favor of the complaint, but the ruling was too late to save Mostek.

Mostek's 256K DRAM had been delayed by a then-ambitious double-layer metallization design. In 1985, when the price for 64Ks had collapsed and 256K prices were already under $10, Mostek's 256K device was still not ready for volume production, and the company suffered heavy losses. Eventually, on 17 October 1985, UTC gave up, closed Mostek completely, and days later sold it to Thomson-CSF, a French Government electronics company, for a mere $71 million. UTC did retain a Mostek fab in Colorado Springs as the UTMicroElectronics Center.

By 1986, all United States chip makers, with the exception of Texas Instruments, Micron Technology, Motorola and IBM had stopped making DRAM. As of 1990, they represented less than 10% of the world's supply.

== Afterword ==
Thomson called back only about 20% of the workforce in an attempt to return Mostek to profitability. Thomson's Mostek operations continued under the name TCMC (Thomson Components - Mostek Corp).

In 1987 Thomson spun-off and merged its semiconductor operations, including Mostek, with the Italian SGS-ATES to become STMicroelectronics, based in Geneva, Switzerland. At the time of the merger the new corporation was named SGS-Thomson but took its current name in May 1998 following Thomson's sale of its shares. Mostek's intellectual property portfolio, which included many foundational patents in DRAM technology, turned out to be highly valuable. STM started a series of lawsuits to collect royalties and between 1987 and 1993 made $450 million on these licenses alone.

STM continued operations at the Carrollton site for several years. A small residual operation is located in Coppell, Texas. A group of Mostek veterans gathers for a yearly lunch in February under the name "MostekLives!".

== Spin-offs ==
Jerry Rogers founded Cyrix in 1988 to capitalize on the Mostek second source agreement that allowed any 80x86 processor to be legally copied, which Intel attempted to stop via lawsuits. Eventually, after losing many legal battles, Intel simply changed the name of the 80586 to the Pentium, thereby ending the agreement.

Micron Technology is a profitable spin-off founded by a handful of Mostek employees, including Ward Parkinson, Dennis Wilson, and Doug Pitman.

Sevin Rosen Funds co-founded by LJ Sevin funded Compaq Computers, Cyrix, Convex Computers and more.

Bob Paluck started Convex Computers in 1982. Vin Prothro started Dallas Semiconductor in ca 1984. Mike Callahan started Crystal Semiconductor in ca 1979. Charles Johnson started SRX in ca 1981.

== Mostek Manufacturing ==
As a full IDM (Integrated Device Manufacturer) Mostek had a full array of divisions including Design, Photomask, Wafer Fab, Test, Assembly/Packaging, Product Engineering, Quality/Reliability, Sales/Marketing. For nearly all of its existence Bob Palmer was Senior Vice-President over all these divisions.

== Photomask ==
Jim Piker founded and managed Mostek's in-house Photomask operations. The photomask step and repeat techniques eventually were copied for wafer fabrication ca 1968.

== Wafer Fabrication ==
Mostek's first wafer fab was provided by Sprague at its plant in Worcester, Ma near Boston. In ca 1973, Mary Ann Potter founded and managed Fab1 at 1215 Crosby Rd in Carrollton, Tx, a NW suburb of Dallas, in a converted warehouse around the corner from Mostek's corporate office on Upfield St.

Also at the main Crosby Rd site: a small R&D fab was started ca 1974 which eventually became Fab3, Fab2 was founded ca 1975, Fab4 (in a new building) ca 1978, Fab5 in 1979, Fab6 ca 1984, and a Colorado Springs Fab ca 1984.

== Test ==
Testing and Burn-In were located at the main site on Crosby Rd.

== Assembly/Packaging ==
Mostek's main Packaging operations were in Panang, Malaysia.
