= Altitude SEE Test European Platform =

French observatory

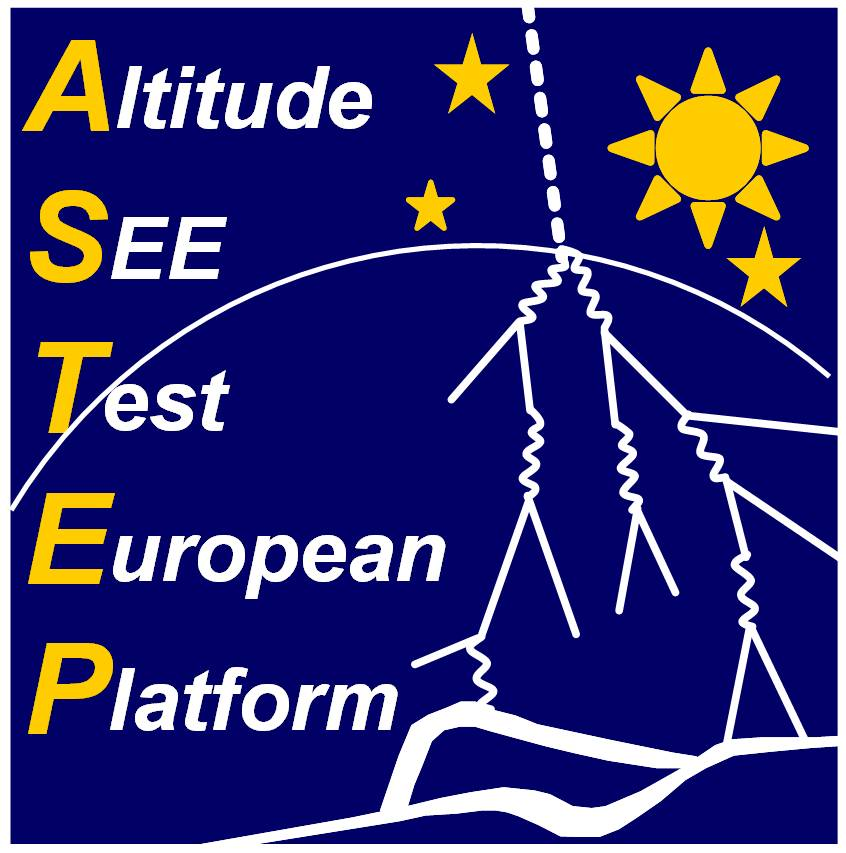

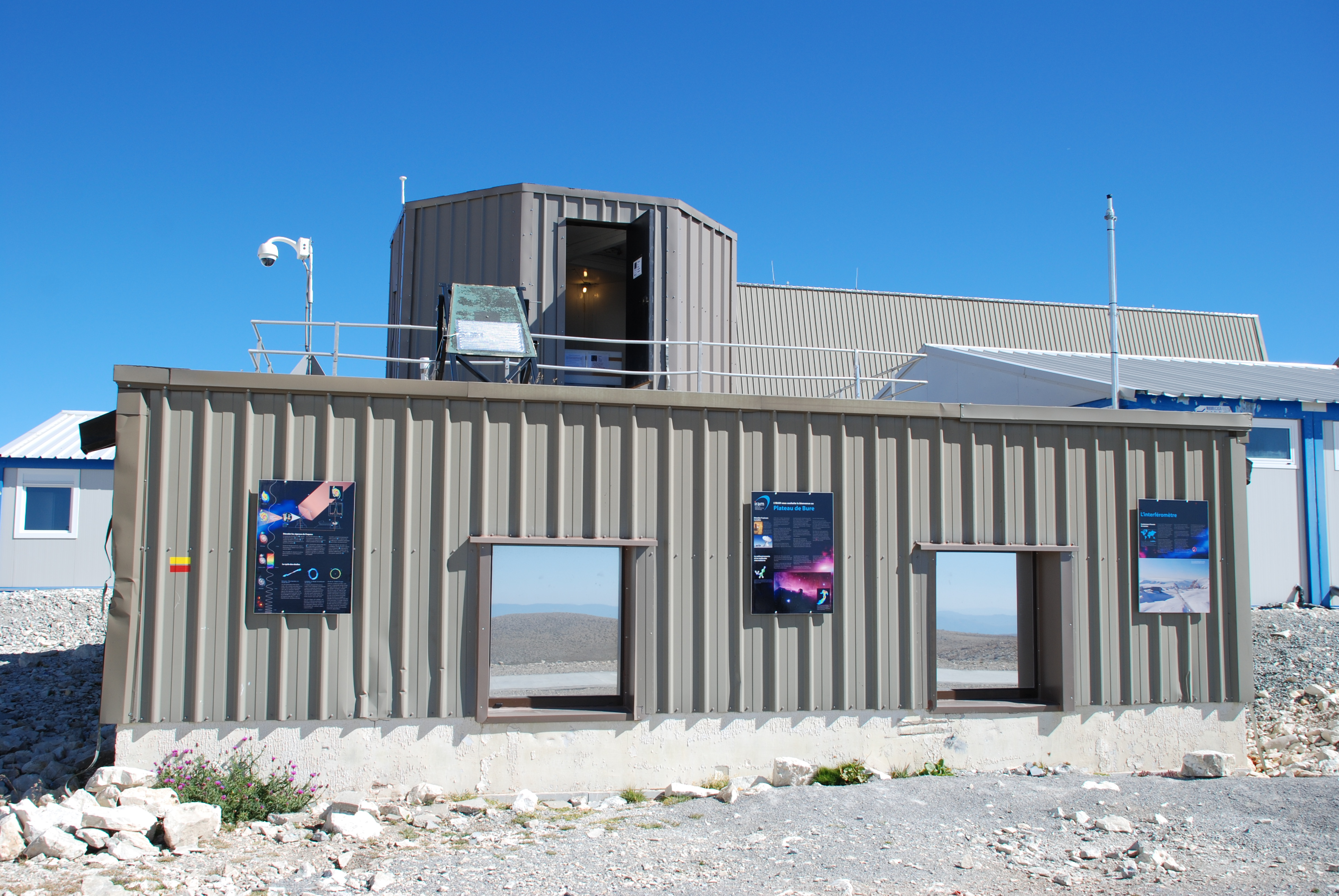
- Main building of the ASTEP Platform photographed in August 2012 on the Plateau de Bure.
- Alternative names: ASTEP
- Location: France
- Coordinates: 44°38′02″N 5°54′26″E
- Altitude: 2,252 m (7,388 ft)
- Website: www.astep.eu
- Related media on Commons

The Altitude SEE Test European Platform (ASTEP) is a permanent mountain laboratory and a dual academic research platform created by Aix-Marseille University, CNRS and STMicroelectronics in 2004. The current platform, operated by IM2NP Laboratory, is dedicated to the problematic of Single Event Effect (SEE) induced by terrestrial radiation (atmospheric neutrons, protons and muons) in electronic components, circuits and systems. Located in the French Alps on the desert Plateau de Bure at 2552m (Dévoluy mountains), the platform is hosted by the IRAM Observatory ASTEP is fully operational since March 2006.

The platform hosts long-term experiments in the fields of real-time testing, soft error characterization and metrology. ASTEP is also permanently equipped with a neutron monitor (referenced as the Plateau de Bure Neutron Monitor, PdBNM) and a muon monitor (Plateau de Bure Muon Monitor, PdBM2). The Plateau de Bure Neutron Monitor is affiliated to the Neutron Monitor Database (NMDB) international network of instruments (code station: BURE)

== Timeline ==
- 2004: The project of a permanent mountain laboratory dedicated to the issue of Single Event Effects (SEE) and Soft Errors (SE) in electronics is launched. The Plateau de Bure is finally chosen as the permanent location of the ASTEP platform. A host convention is signed between CNRS and IRAM to formalize the installation of the ASTEP platform on the Plateau de Bure.
- 2005: The ancient building "POM2" of the IRAM Observatory is fully rehabilitated by the City of Saint-Etienne en Dévoluy in order to host the scientific instruments of the platform. The first equipments are installed on site in September 2005. The permanent network connection between ASTEP and IM2NP Laboratory in Marseille is tested. In parallel, the first real-time (life testing) experiment dedicated to the characterization of 130 nm SRAM memories is launched. The experimental setup is presented during a public conference on December at the General Council of Hautes Alpes in Gap.
- 2006: The 130 nm SRAM setup is installed on ASTEP in March 2006 and the measurements start on April 29, 2005. The first experimental measurements are presented at the European Workshop on Radiation and its Effects on Components and Systems (RADECS 2006) on 27–29 September 2006, Glyfada, Athens, Greece. The ASTEP Platform is officially inaugurated at Saint-Etienne en Dévoluy and on the Plateau de Bure on July 5, 2005.
- 2007: The rehabilitation works of the first floor of the ASTEP building (ancient cupola of the POM2 building) are launched during the summer period. Works are therefore interrupted by the snow and bad weather conditions in October. The construction of a second setup dedicated to the real-time characterization of 65 nm SRAM memories is launched.
- 2008: The 65 nm setup is installed on ASTEP in January. Rehabilitation works resumed at the end of May 2008. The Plateau de Bure Neutron Monitor (PdBNM) is installed on the first floor of the ASTEP building on July 23, 2008. The instrument has been fully operational since this date. The first results concerning 65 nm SRAMs are presented at the European Workshop on Radiation and its Effects on Components and Systems (RADECS 2008) in Jyväskylä, Finland, in September 2008.
- 2009: High temperature tests (85 °C) are conducted on the 65 nm SRAMs to investigate Single Event Latchup (SEL) and micro-latchup mechanisms.
- 2010: The ASTEP platform and collaboration program is presented during an invited talk at ESREF 2010.
- 2011: A third real-time setup embedding more than 7 Gbits of 40 nm SRAMs is designed and integrated. The setup is installed on ASTEP in March. The Plateau de Bure Neutron Monitor joined the Neutron Monitor Data Base (NMDB). The Plateau de Bure Muon Monitor (PdBM2), developed at IM2NP-CNRS laboratory in Marseille, is installed on the ASTEP platform during July/August. A new type of wafer-level characterization based on more than 50 Gbit of 90 nm NOR flash memories subjected to natural radiation is launched.
- 2012: The first results concerning the 40 nm SRAM experiment are presented at the International Reliability Physics Symposium (IRPS 2012) in Anaheim, CA, USA. Additional results concerning thermal neutron sensitivity of these 40 nm SRAMs are presented at the IEEE NSREC 2012 Conference.
- 2013: The first results concerning the characterization of flash memories subjected to natural radiation are presented at the International Reliability Physics Symposium (IRPS 2013) in Monterey, CA, USA.
