= STMicroelectronics =

Semiconductor device manufacturer

STMicroelectronics NV

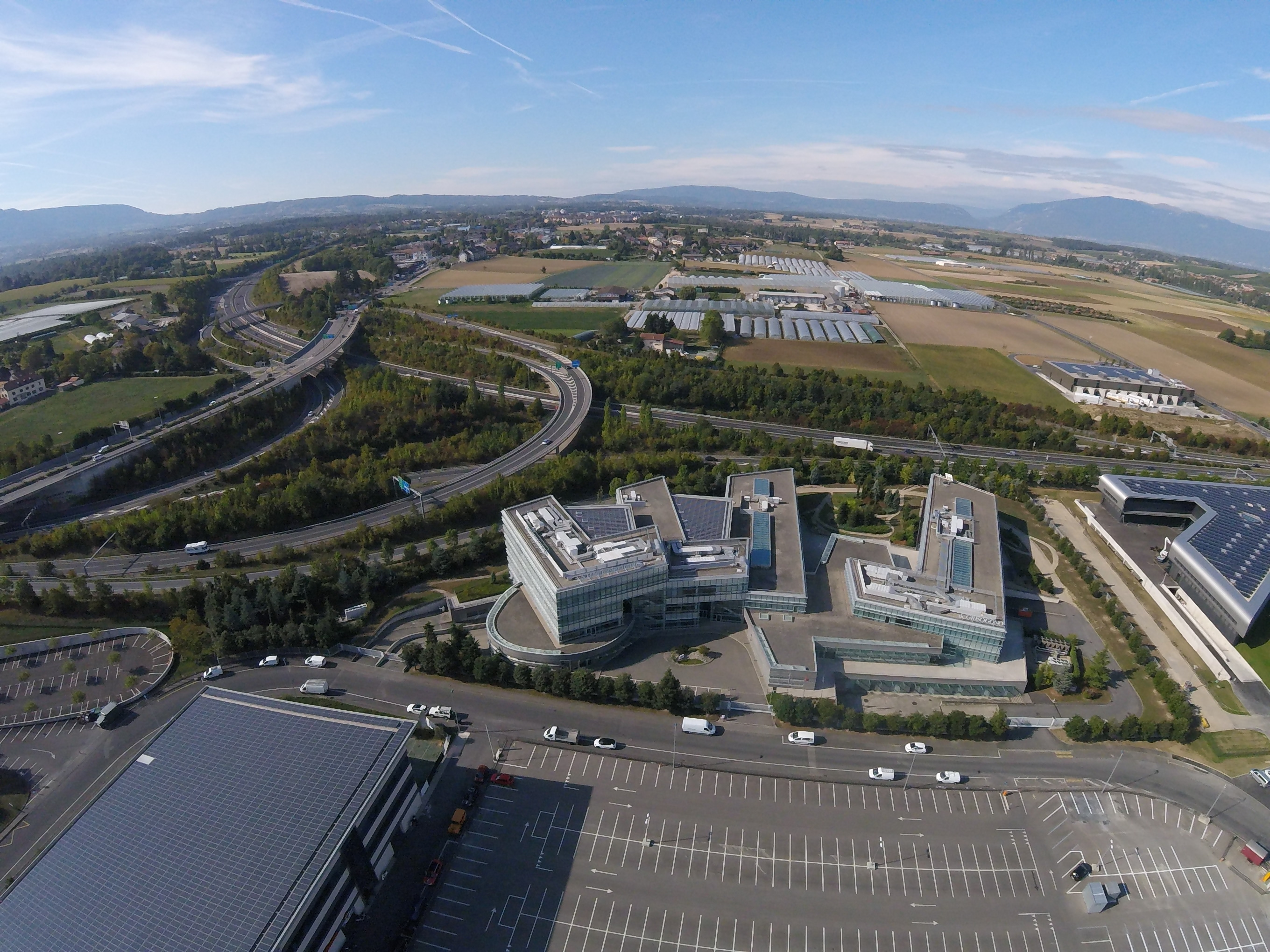
- Headquarters in Plan-les-Ouates, Switzerland
- Type: Public
- Traded as: Euronext Paris: STMPA; BIT: STMMI; CAC 40 component; FTSE MIB component
- ISIN: NL0000226223
- Industry: Semiconductors
- Predecessors: SGS Microelettronica; Thomson Semiconductors
- Founded: 1987; 39 years ago
- Founder: Elihu Thomson; Camillo Olivetti
- Headquarters: Plan-les-Ouates, Geneva, Switzerland
- Key people: Jean-Marc Chery (president and CEO); Nicolas Dufourcq (chairman)
- Products: ASICs, memory (including EEPROM), microcontrollers, microprocessors, transistors, smartcards, MEMS
- Revenue: ▼US$13.27 billion (2024)
- Operating income: ▼US$1.676 billion (2024)
- Net income: ▼US$1.565 billion (2024)
- Total assets: ▲US$24.74 billion (2024)
- Total equity: ▲US$17.68 billion (2024)
- Number of employees: 49,602 (2024)
- Website: www.st.com
- Footnotes: Financials as of 31 December 2024

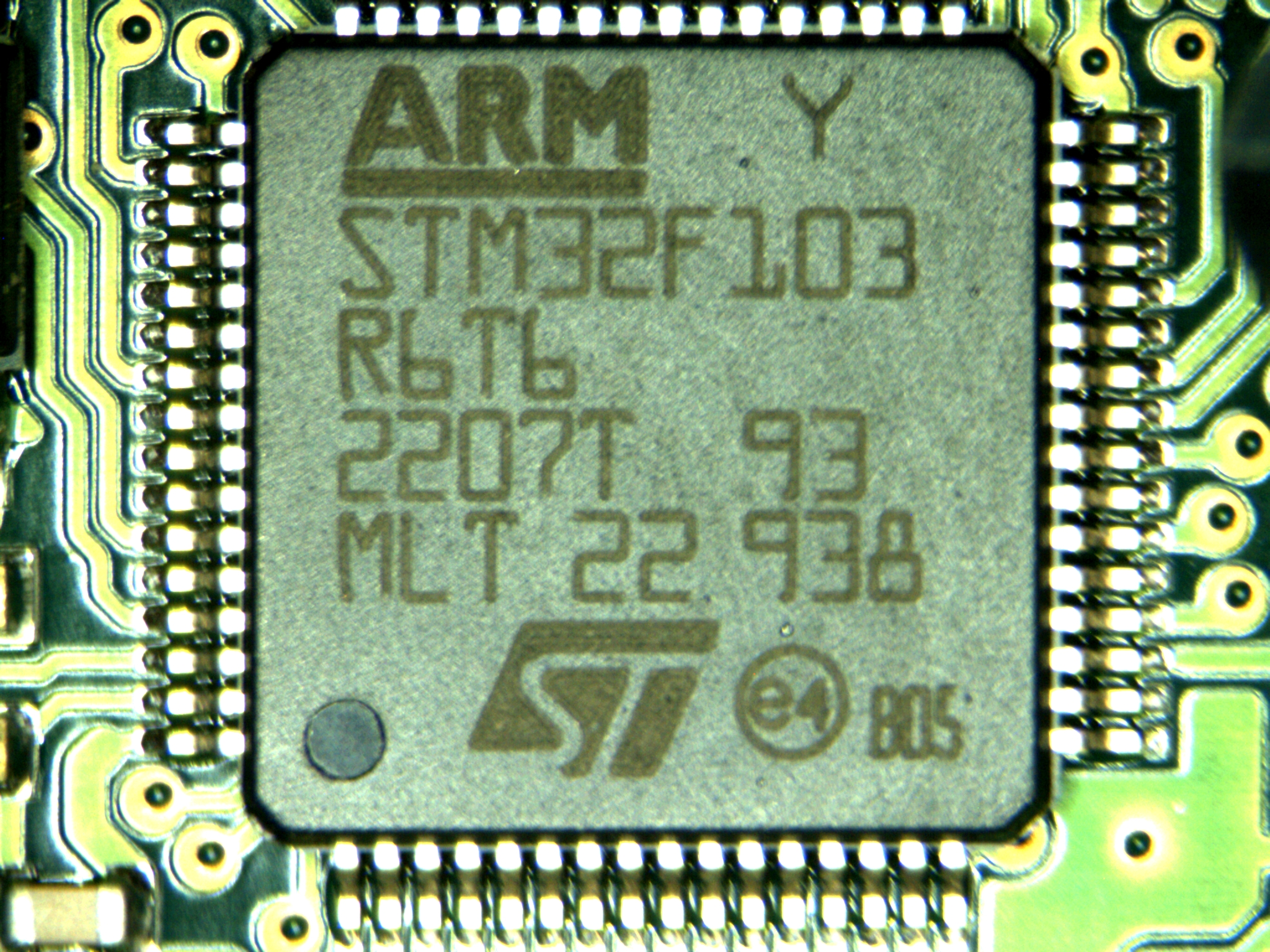
STM32 microcontroller made by STMicroelectronics

STMicroelectronics NV (commonly referred to as ST or STMicro) is a European multinational semiconductor contract manufacturing and design company. It is the largest of such companies in Europe. The company is incorporated in the Netherlands and headquartered in Plan-les-Ouates, Switzerland. It manufactures a wide range of microelectronics, including the widely used STM8 and STM32 microcontrollers.

ST was founded in 1987 from the merger of two state-owned semiconductor corporations, SGS Microelettronica of Italy and Thomson Semiconducteurs of France, with the aim of creating a corporation that could compete effectively with international semiconductor manufacturers. From early on, the company's senior management sought out poorly-served niches in the global market, such as microcontrollers, application-specific integrated circuits (ASICs) and analogue chips, and pursued vertical integration of its manufacturing. Another key strategy of ST was its focus on strategic partnerships, such as with Nokia and Seagate Technology; it would form 31 separate strategic alliances within its first 14 years of operation. In 1994, ST was floated on the Paris and New York stock exchanges, as well as being listed on the Italian Bourse four years later, at which point Thomson SA sold its stake in the ST. To further consolidate and expand its position in the semiconductor industry, numerous acquisitions were completed during the 1990s, helping ST to become the third largest chipmaker (in terms of sales) during 2001.

The company's growth slowed somewhat during the 2000s; several major partnerships were formed during this decade, including the memory-oriented joint venture Numonyx between Intel and ST, the Crolles 2 Alliance between Motorola, TSMC, Philips, and the ST Ericsson joint venture that joined ST-NXP Wireless with Ericsson Mobile Platforms. In the 2010s, ST became a key supplier for SpaceX's Starlink satellite communications network. In 2023, ST partnered with Synopsys to design a working chip on Microsoft's cloud platform, marking the first instance that artificial intelligence (AI) software had been utilized for chip design. In 2025, ST launched a new chip co-developed with Amazon Web Services (AWS) for the AI data centre sector.

== History ==
=== Background ===
ST was formed in 1987 by the merger of two government-owned semiconductor companies: Italian SGS Microelettronica (where SGS stands for Società Generale Semiconduttori, "General Semiconductor Company"), and French Thomson Semiconducteurs, the semiconductor arm of Thomson.

SGS Microelettronica originated in 1972 from the merger of two companies (the L'Aquila-based vacuum tube and semiconductor producer ATES (Aquila Tubi e Semiconduttori), and the Agrate Brianza-headquartered semiconductor specialist Società Generale Semiconduttori). By the mid-1980s, SGS had been under pressure from multiple larger American competitors, including Texas Instruments and Motorola.

Thomson Semiconducteurs was created in 1982 by the French government's widespread nationalization of industries following the election of François Mitterrand to the presidency. It comprised the semiconductor activities of the French electronics company Thomson; the US-based firm Mostek (bought from United Technologies in 1985); Silec (established in 1977); Eurotechnique (founded in 1979 as a joint venture between Saint-Gobain of France and US-based National Semiconductor); EFCIS (formerly known as CEA-Leti); and SESCOSEM (founded in 1969). While Thomson Semiconducteurs was both loss-making and bureaucratic, it had conducted advanced research into emerging chip technologies.

The motivation for the cross-border merger that created ST came from both political and economic sources. By creating SGS-Thomson Microelectronics as a new entity headquartered in Geneva, politicians in both France and Italy sought to create a more powerful European company that could stand up against American dominance of the industry, and even prevent Europe from greater dependence on imported technology. Furthermore, both SGS and Thomson already cooperated in some areas, including a strategic alliance to develop and produce non-volatile memory. Upon its creation in 1987, this new corporation was named SGS-THOMSON and headed by chief executive officer Pasquale Pistorio.

=== Early activities ===
Shortly after its establishment, SGS-Thomson was the 14th largest semiconductor suppliers, recording US$850 million sales. Rather that competing head-to-head with its largest competitors, the early business strategy of STM was to orient towards various niches of the market that possessed high growth potential, which included sensors, microcontrollers, power electronics, and application-specific integrated circuits (ASICs). One key early example of this strategy took place in 1989, when STM produced a chip that integrated power supply and power management functions that improved the performance of the mobile phones produced by the Finnish firm Nokia. Furthermore, in contrast to many American and Japanese chip manufacturers that chose to halt production of analogue chips in favour of digital ones during the 1980s, ST retained its analogue capacity, which was required for managing power, radio frequency transmission, sound, and graphics; accordingly ST was well-positioned when such chips were needed in volume during the 1990s in growth areas such as mobile phones, wireless computers, and consumer devices such as DVD players.

Early on, ST entered into prosperous strategic alliances with the French firms Thomson Multimedia and Alcatel (in the consumer electronics and telecommunications sectors respectively). Recognising that the largest growth opportunities were in the wider international market, senior management successfully secured its first major oversea alliance with Seagate Technology, the world's largest producer of hard drives. Under this alliance, ST used its custom chips to develop smaller, cheaper, and more energy-efficient drives; accordingly, Seagate became one of ST's largest customers. ST typically pursued a strategy of gradually deepening its business relationships, over a ten year period, Nokia elevated ST from being an ordinary supplier, to a premier supplier, and then to a partner.

Throughout the 1990s, STM pursued vertical integration, performing the design, manufacture, and testing of its own semiconductors inhouse; this was in contrast to most European-based electronics firms, which were typically either downsizing or outsourcing production to other parties. The company experienced double-digit growth during the early 1990s.

On 8 December 1994, the company completed its initial public offering on the Paris and New York stock exchanges. Owner Thomson SA sold its stake in the company in 1998 when the company also listed on the Italian Bourse in Milan, after which the firm adopted its current name of STMicroelectronics.

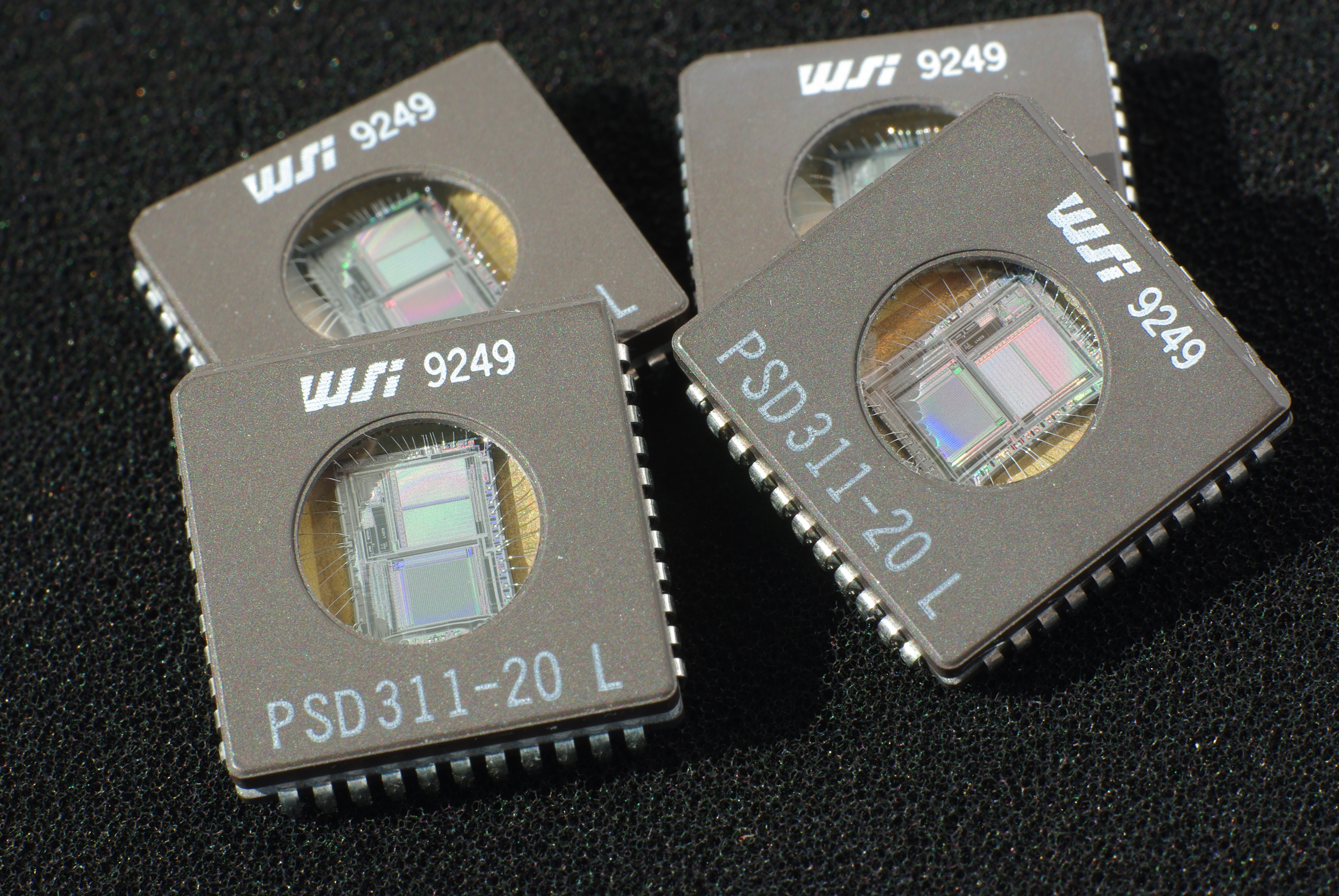
4 Field-Programmable Microcontroller Peripheral from Wafer Scale Integration PSD311

ST has been an active participating in the consolidation of the semiconductor industry. Between 1989 and 2000, it acquired numerous other companies. In 1989, it bought the British company Inmos, known for its transputer microprocessors, from parent Thorn EMI. In 1999, it acquired the research & development company UK-based VLSI-Vision CMOS Image Sensor, which had been a spin-off from Edinburgh University; following the purchase, it became STMicroelectronics' Imaging Division. In 2000, it purchased the semiconductor activities of the Canadian telecoms firm Nortel. That same year, ST also bought WaferScale Integration Inc. (WSI, Fremont, California), a vendor of EPROM and flash-memory-based programmable system chips;

=== 2000s ===
In 2001, ST became the third largest chipmaker (in terms of sales) behind Intel and Toshiba and had operations across 27 countries. Bolstered by no less than 31 separate strategic alliances, the firm had experienced a compound average revenue growth rate of 20.3 percent between 1998 and 2001. Another factor credited for ST's strong performance was its decentralised corporate organisation, which minimised overhead and hierarchy and left many impactful decisions to peripherical figures. The firm's customer base comprised a wide array of manufacturers across the consumer electronics, telecommunications, computer peripherals, automobiles, and security sectors.

In 2002, Motorola and TSMC joined ST and Philips in a new technology partnership; the Crolles 2 Alliance was created, being named after a new 12" wafer manufacturing facility located in Crolles, France. Also in 2002, Alcatel's Microelectronics division, which along with the incorporation of smaller ventures such as the UK company Synad Ltd, was acquired by ST, helping the company expand into the Wireless-LAN market. In 2007, the US-based video processing specialist Genesis Microchip was also bought.

In 2005, long-running chief executive officer Pasquale Pistorio was succeeded by Carlo Bozotti, who had previously headed the memory products division and had been with the company's predecessor since 1977. That same year, ST was ranked fifth, behind Intel, Samsung, Texas Instruments and Toshiba, but ahead of Infineon, Renesas, NEC, NXP Semiconductors and Freescale. The company was the largest European semiconductors supplier, ahead of Infineon and NXP.

Early in 2007, NXP Semiconductors (formerly Philips Semiconductors) and Freescale (formerly Motorola Semiconductors) decided to stop their participation in the Crolles 2 Alliance. Accordingly, this Alliance came to an end on 31 December 2007. On 22 May 2007, ST and Intel created a joint venture in the memory application called Numonyx: this new company merged ST and Intel Flash Memory activities. Semiconductor market consolidation continued with ST and NXP announcing on 10 April 2008, the creation of a new joint venture of their mobile activities, with ST owning 80% of the new company and NXP 20%. This joint venture began on 20 August 2008. On 10 February 2009, ST Ericsson, a joint venture bringing together ST-NXP Wireless and Ericsson Mobile Platforms, was established.

=== 2010s ===
During the early 2010s, ST Ericsson, a 50/50 joint venture between STMicroelectronics and Ericsson, was active as a multinational manufacturer of wireless products and semiconductors that were typically supplied to mobile device manufacturers. Headquartered in Geneva, it was a fabless company, outsourcing semiconductor manufacturing to foundry companies. In March 2013, it was announced that ST Ericsson would be dissolved; ST took on all of ST-Ericsson products except for the LTE multimode modem that was transferred to Ericsson.

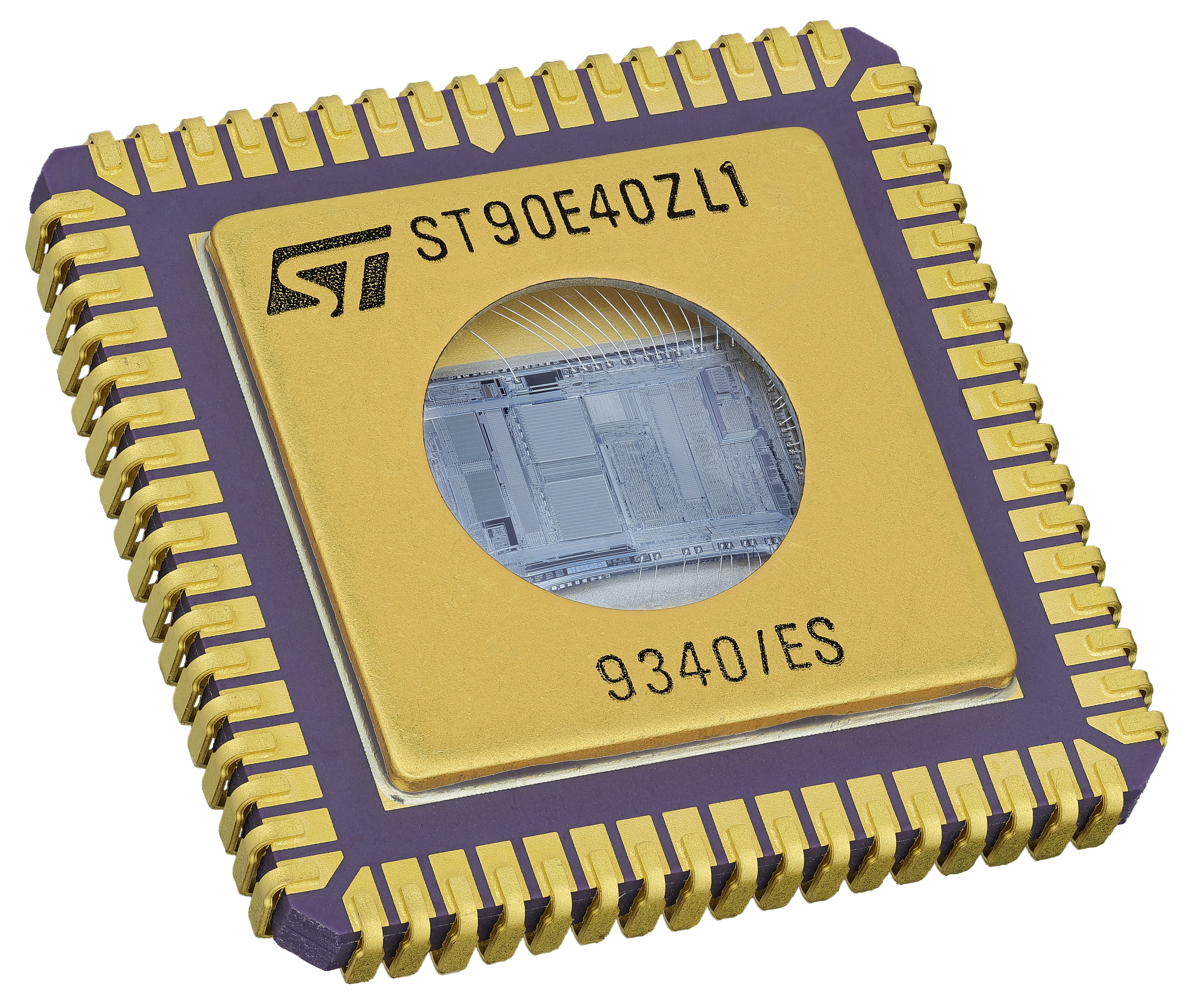
ST90E40ZL1 – HCMOS MCU with 16Kbytes EPROM, 512 bytes EEPROM, 256 bytes RAM and A/D Converter in a 68-leaded windowed ceramic quad flat pack package

In 2011, ST announced the creation of a joint lab with Sant'Anna School of Advanced Studies to conduct research and innovation in the fields of biorobotics, smart systems and microelectronics. Past collaborations with Sant'Anna School of Advanced Studies included DustBot, a platform that integrated self-navigating "service robots" for waste collection.

During 2012, ST was reported to be the third largest R&D budget across the global semiconductor industry, behind only Intel and Samsung. Three years later, the MEMS division of ST was ranked as the biggest European competitor of Silex Microsystems.

Starting in 2015, ST and SpaceX have collaborated on design of custom-made components for satellite communication. Starlink products have been co-designed with ST engineers located in France and Italy, produced in fabs located in France while packaging and testing was performed in both Malaysia and Malta. Amongst other elements, ST is responsible for the manufacture of the Starlink user terminals.

In 2018, chief executive Carlo Bozotti was succeeded by Jean-Marc Chery.

=== 2020s ===
In 2023, ST partnered with Synopsys to design a working chip on Microsoft's cloud platform, marking the first instance that artificial intelligence (AI) software had been utilized for chip design.

In 2024, ST became the sixth shareholder of Quintauris, a joint company with the goal of standardizing RISC-V ecosystem.

In 2025, the Italian government was reportedly seeking greater oversight of ST, and sought to appoint Marcello Sala, head of the economy ministry's department overseeing state-run firms and asset disposals, to ST's supervisory board; this was allegedly motived by the company's planned $300 million cost-cutting program that could have involved more than 2,000 job cuts in Italy. According to the company, 1,000 of the 2,800 positions to be eliminated around the world will be in France.

On 3 June 2025, the ST division of France's General Confederation of Labour published a letter to ST leadership, criticising their relationship with Israel's military in the context of the Gaza genocide, such as the "ST-Up" startup incubator, which has been linked to "infiniDome", a startup developing GPS technology for drones, and "Lidwave", a startup developing real-time 4D mapping services, both allegedly intended for use by the IDF. As part of industrial action, CGT members at an STMicroelectronics factory in France engaged in a work stoppage against the company's provision of chips and semiconductors for the Israeli military.

In 2025, it was announced that ST had delivered in excess of five billion radio-frequency antenna chips for SpaceX's Starlink satellite network over a ten year period, and that this volume could be set to double within two years.

In 2025, ST launched a new chip oriented towards the AI data centre market, the firm had co-developed this chip with Amazon Web Services (AWS). In February 2026, ST started the supply a range of chip solutions for AWS' data centres under a multi-year deal that was valued in excess of $1 billion. One month later, it launched high-volume production of its PIC100 photonics chip, which is targeted at the data centre market.

== Shareholders ==
As of December 31, 2014, the shareholders were:

- 68.4% public (New York Stock Exchange, Euronext Paris, Borsa Italiana Milano);
- 4.1% treasury shares;
- 27.6% STMicroelectronics Holding B.V.:
  - 50% FT1CI (Bpifrance 79.2% and French Alternative Energies and Atomic Energy Commission (CEA) 20.8%; previously Areva and CEA);
  - 50% Ministry of Economy and Finance of Italy (Finmeccanica until 2004, Cassa Depositi e Prestiti until 2010, both between 2004–2009).

== Manufacturing facilities ==
Unlike fabless semiconductor companies, STMicroelectronics owns and operates its own semiconductor wafer fabs. The company owned five 8-inch (200 mm) wafer fabs and one 12-inch (300 mm) wafer fab in 2006. Most of the production is scaled at 0.18 μm, 0.13 μm, 90 nm and 65 nm (measurements of transistor gate length). STMicroelectronics also owns back-end plants, where silicon dies are assembled and bonded into plastic or ceramic packages.

Major sites include:

=== Grenoble, France ===
Grenoble is one of the company's most important R&D centres, employing around 4,000 staff. The Polygone site employs 2,200 staff and is one of the historical bases of the company (ex SGS). All the historical wafer fab lines are now closed but the site hosts the headquarters of many divisions (marketing, design, industrialization) and a R&D centre, focused on silicon and software design and fab process development.

The Crolles site hosts a 200 mm (8 in) and a 300 mm (12 in) fab and was originally built as a common R&D centre for submicrometre technologies as part of the 1990 Grenoble 92 partnership between SGS-Thomson and CNET, the R&D center of French telecom company France Telecom.

The 300 mm (12 in) fab was inaugurated by French president Jacques Chirac, on 27 February 2003. It includes an R&D centre which focuses on developing new nanometric technology processes for 90-nm to 32-nm scale using 300 mm (12 in) wafers and it was developed for The Crolles 2 Alliance. This alliance of STMicroelectronics, TSMC, NXP Semiconductors (formerly Philips semiconductor) and Freescale (formerly Motorola semiconductor) partnered in 2002 to develop the facility and to work together on process development. The technologies developed at the facility were also used by global semiconductor foundry TSMC of Taiwan, allowing TSMC to build the products developed in Crolles on behalf of the Alliance partners who required such foundry capacity.

=== Rousset, France ===
Employing around 3,000 staff, Rousset hosts several division headquarters including smartcards, microcontrollers, and EEPROM as well as several R&D centers. Rousset also hosts an 8-inch (200-mm) fab, which was opened on May 15, 2000 by French prime minister Lionel Jospin.

The site opened in 1979 as a 100 mm (3.9 in) fab operated by Eurotechnique, a joint venture between Saint-Gobain of France and National Semiconductor of the US. Rousset was sold to Thomson-CSF in 1982 as part of the French government's 1981–82 nationalization of several industries. As part of the nationalisation, a former Thomson plant in the center of Aix-en-Provence operating since the 1960s was closed and staff were transferred to the new Rousset site. The original 100 mm (4 in) fab was upgraded into 130 mm (5 in) and later 150 mm (6 in) fab in 1996. It is now being shut down. The site also has a "Wafer Level Chip Scale Packaging" accreditation for eSIM ICs.

In 1988, a small group of employees from the Thomson Rousset plant (including the director, Marc Lassus) founded a start-up company, Gemalto (formerly known as Gemplus), which became a leader in the smartcard industry.

=== Tours, France ===
Employing 1,500 staff, this site hosts a fab and R&D centres.

=== Milan, Italy ===
Employing 6,000 staff, the Milan facilities match Grenoble in importance. Agrate Brianza employs around 4,000 staff and is a historical base of the company (ex SGS). The site has several fab lines (including a 300 mm (12 in) fab) and an R&D center. Castelletto, employs 300 to 400 staff and hosts some divisions and R&D centres.

=== Catania, Italy ===
The Catania plant in Sicily employs 5,000 staff and hosts several R&D centers and divisions, focusing on flash memory technologies as well as two fabs. The plant was launched in 1961 by ATES to supply under licensing to RCA of the US and initially using germanium. The site's two major wafer fabs are a 200 mm (8 in) fab, opened in April 1997 by then-Italian Prime Minister Romano Prodi, and a 300 mm (12 in) fab that has never been completed and which was transferred in its current state to "Numonyx" in 2008. A new manufacturing facility for silicon carbide (SiC) substrates of 150 mm should open here in 2023.

In October 2022, the EU supported STMicroelectronics for the construction of a silicon carbide wafer plant in Catania with €293 million through the Recovery and Resilience Facility to be completed in 2026, and in line with the European Chips Act.

=== Caserta, Italy ===
STmicro eSIM and SIM production facility for embedded form factor eSIM.

=== Kirkop, Malta ===
As of 2010, ST employed around 1,800 people in Kirkop, making it the largest private sector employer, and the country's leading exporter.

=== Singapore ===
In 1970, SGS created its first assembly back-end plant in Singapore, in the area of Toa Payoh. Then in 1981, SGS decided to build a wafer fab in Singapore. Converted up to 200 mm (8 in) fab, this is now an important 200 mm (8 in) wafer fab of the group. Ang Mo Kio also hosts some design centres. As of 2004, the site employed 6,000 staff.

=== Tunis, Tunisia ===
This site is focused on application, design and support and has about 110 employees.

=== Bouskoura, Morocco ===
Founded in 1979 as a radiofrequency products facility, the Bouskoura site now hosts back-end manufacturing activity, which includes chip testing and packaging. Since 2022 it also features a production line for silicon carbide products that primarily will be used in electric vehicles.

=== Norrköping, Sweden ===
The Norrköping plant is a wafer fab that, at the start of production in 2021, was the first to produce 200 mm (8 in) Silicone Carbide wafers. The wafers are mostly used for SiC power devices.

== Other sites ==
=== Administrative headquarters ===
- Geneva, Switzerland: Corporate headquarter which hosts most of the ST top management. It totals some hundred of employees.
- Paris: Marketing and support.

=== Regional headquarters ===
- Coppell, Texas: US headquarters.
- Singapore: Headquarters for the Asia-Pacific region.
- Tokyo: Headquarters for Japan and Korea operations.
- Shanghai: Headquarters for China operations.

=== Assembly plants ===
- Malta: In 1981, SGS-Thomson (now STMicroelectronics) built its first assembly plant in Malta. STMicroelectronics is, as of 2008, the largest private employer on the island, employing around 1,800 people.
- Muar, Malaysia: around 4000 employees. This site was built in 1974 by Thomson and is now an assembly plant.
- Shenzhen, Guangdong province, China: In 1994, ST and the Shenzhen Electronics Group signed a partnership to construct and jointly operate an assembly plant (ST has majority with 60%). The plant is located in Futian Free Trade Zone and became operational in 1996. It has around 3,300 employees. A new assembly plant is built in Longgang since 2008, and closed up till 2014. The R&D, design, sales and marketing office is located in the Hi-tech industrial park in Nanshan, Shenzhen.
- Calamba in the province of Laguna, Philippines: In 2008, ST acquired this plant from NXP Semiconductors. Initially as part of joint venture with NXP but later acquired the whole share turning it into a full-fledged STMicroelectronics Assembly and Testing plant. Currently it employs 2,000 employees.

=== Design centres ===
- Cairo, Egypt: Hardware and software design center, started in 2020, with 50 employees.
- Rabat, Morocco: A design center that employs 160 people.
- Naples, Italy: A design center employing 300 people.
- Lecce, Italy: HW & SW Design Center which hosts 20 researchers in the Advanced System Technology group.
- Ang Mo Kio, Singapore: In 1970, SGS created its first assembly back-end plant in Singapore, in the area of Toa Payoh. Then in 1981, SGS decided to build a wafer fab in Singapore. The Singapore technical engineers have been trained in Italy and the fab of Ang Mo Kio started to produce its first wafers in 1984. Converted up to 8 inch (200 mm) fab, this is now an important 8 inch (200 mm) wafer fab of the ST group.
- Greater Noida, India: The Noida site was launched in 1992 to conduct software engineering activities. A silicon design centre was inaugurated in 1995. With 120 employees, it was the largest design center of the company outside Europe at the time. In 2006, the site was shifted to Greater Noida for further expansion. The site hosts mainly design teams.
- Santa Clara, California, (Silicon Valley), United States: 120 staff in marketing, design and applications.
- La Jolla, California, (San Diego, United States): 80 staff in design and applications.
- Lancaster, Pennsylvania, United States: Application, support, and marketing.
- Prague, Czech Republic: 100 to 200 employees. Application, design and support.
- Tunis, Tunisia: 110 employees. Application, design and support.
- Sophia Antipolis, near Nice, France: Design center with a few hundred employees.
- Edinburgh, Scotland: 200 staff focused in the field of imaging and photon detection.
- Ottawa, Ontario, Canada: In 1993, SGS-Thomson purchased the semiconductor activities of Nortel which owned in Ottawa an R&D center and a fab. The fab was closed in 2000, however, a design, R&D centre and sales office is operating in the city.
- Toronto, Ontario, Canada: HW & SW Design Center primarily involved with the design of video processor ICs as part of ST's TVM Division.
- Bangalore, India: HW and SW design center employing more than 250 people (Including the employees of ST Ericsson and Genesis Microchip).
- Zaventem, Belgium: 100 employees. Design & Application Center.
- Helsinki, Finland: Design Center.
- Turku, Finland: Design Center.
- Oulu, Finland: Design Center.
- Tampere, Finland: Design Center.
- Longmont, Colorado United States: Design Center.
- Graz, Austria: NFC Competence Center.
- Pisa, Italy: A design center employing more than 50 people. R&D, analog and digital design.

=== Closing sites ===
The Phoenix, Arizona 8 inch (200 mm) fab, the Carrollton, Texas 6 inch (150 mm) fab, and the Ain Sebaa, Morocco fab were beginning rampdown plans, and were destined to close by 2010.

The Casablanca, Morocco site consists of two assembly parts (Bouskoura and Aïn Sebaâ) and totals around 4000 employees. It was opened in the 1960s by Thomson.

The Bristol, United Kingdom site employing well over 300 at its peak (in 2001/2) but was ramped down to approx. 150 employees at close by early 2014.

The Ottawa, Ontario, Canada plant (approx. 450 employees) was to be close down by 2013 end.

=== Closed sites ===
- Rennes, France hosted a 6-inch (150 mm) fab and was closed in 2004
- Rancho Bernardo, California, US a 4-inch (100 mm) fab created by Nortel and purchased by SGS-Thomson in 1994, after which it was converted into a 6-inch (150 mm) fab in 1996.
- SGS's first presence in the US was a sales office based in Phoenix in the early 1980s. Later, under SGS-Thomson, an 8-inch (200 mm) fab was completed in Phoenix in 1995. The company's second 8" fab after Crolles 1, the site was first dedicated to producing microprocessors for Cyrix. On 10 July 2007, ST said that it would close this site, and in July 2010 the shell of the Phoenix PF1 FAB was bought by Western Digital Corporation.
- The Carrollton, Texas, US site was built in 1969 by Mostek, an American company founded by former employees of Texas Instruments. In 1979, Mostek was acquired by United Technologies, which sold it to Thomson Semiconducteurs in 1985. Initially equipped with a 4-inch (100 mm) fab, it was converted into a 6-inch (150 mm) fab in 1988. The activities of INMOS in the US were transferred to Carrollton in 1989 following its acquisition by SGS Thomson. It was closed in 2010.
- Bristol, UK This R&D site housed Inmos, which in 1978 began development of the Transputer microprocessor. The site was acquired with Inmos in 1989, and was primarily involved with the design of home video and entertainment products (e.g. Set-Top Box), GPS chips, and accompanying software. At its peak the site employed more than 250 employees. The site closed in 2014.

=== Future locations ===
- On 8 August 2007, ST bought Nokia's microchip development team and plans to invest heavily in development of cellular ASIC applications. The purchase included Nokia's ASIC team in Southwood (UK) and the company plans several sites in Finland.
- In June 2023, ST announced its partnership with GlobalFoundries to build a new factory in Crolles, France.

== See also ==
- Altitude SEE Test European Platform (ASTEP)
- Interuniversity Microelectronics Centre (IMEC)
- Numonyx
- ST-Ericsson
- List of semiconductor companies by country
- List of semiconductor fabrication plants
- STM8
- STM32
- (in French) Collectif Autonome et Démocratique de STMicroelectronics (CAD-ST)
