= Intel 8259 =

Programmable interrupt controller

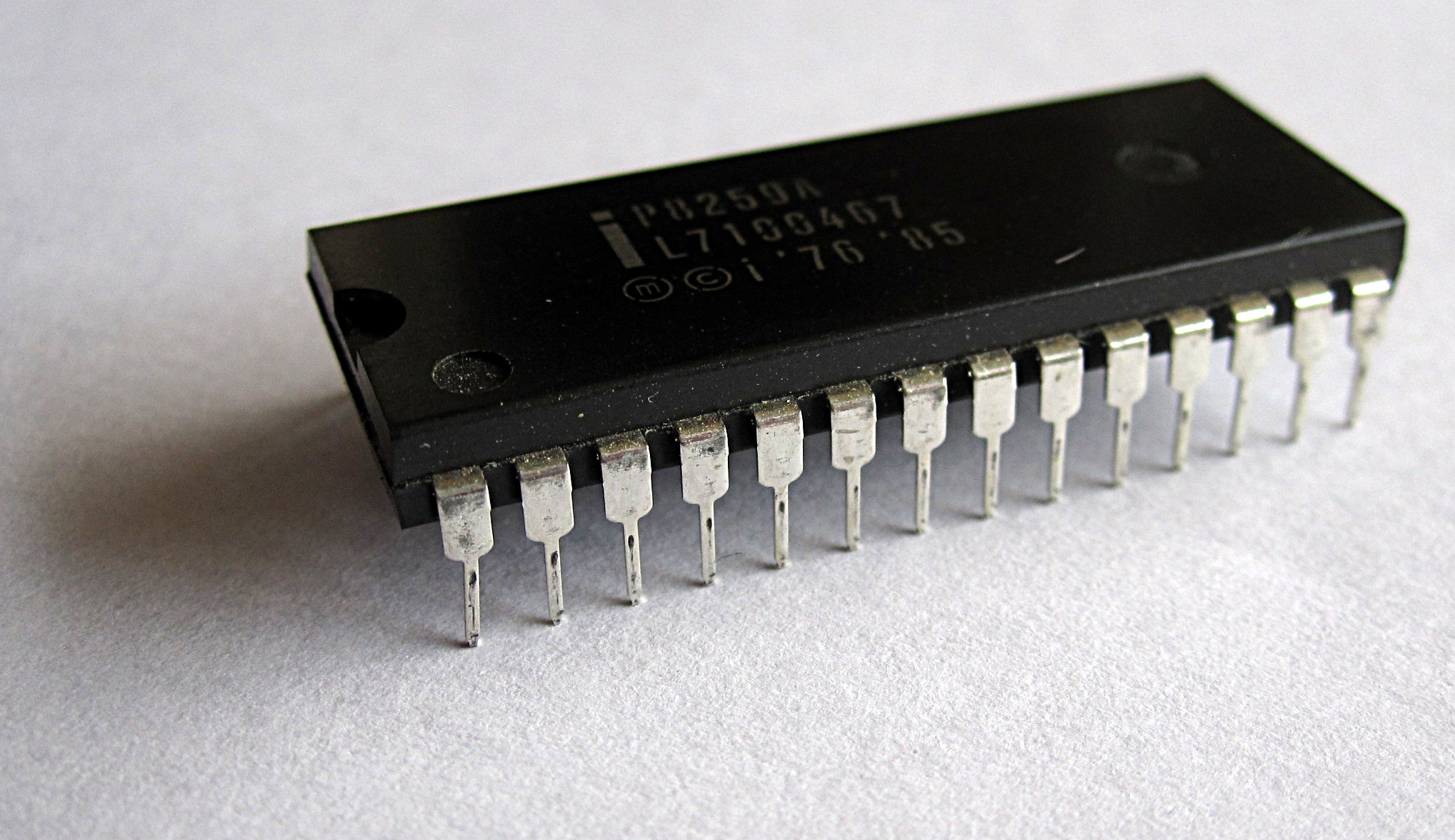
Closeup of an Intel 8259A IRQ chip from a PC XT.

Pinout

The Intel 8259 is a programmable interrupt controller (PIC) designed for the Intel 8080 and Intel 8085 microprocessors. The initial part was the 8259; the later 8259A was upward compatible and usable with the 8086 or 8088 processor. The 8259 combines multiple interrupt input sources into a single interrupt output to the host microprocessor, extending the interrupt levels available in a system beyond the one or two levels found on the processor chip. The 8259A was the interrupt controller for the ISA bus in the original IBM PC and IBM PC AT.

The 8259 was introduced as part of Intel's MCS 85 family in 1976. The 8259A was included in the original PC introduced in 1981 and maintained by the PC/XT when introduced in 1983. A second 8259A was added with the introduction of the PC/AT. The 8259 has coexisted with the Intel APIC Architecture since its introduction in symmetric multiprocessor PCs. Modern PCs have begun to phase out the 8259A in favor of the Intel APIC Architecture. However, while not anymore a separate chip, the 8259A interface is still provided by the Platform Controller Hub or southbridge on modern x86 motherboards.

== Functional description ==
The main signal pins on an 8259 are as follows: eight interrupt request input lines named IRQ0 through IRQ7, an interrupt request output line named INTR, interrupt acknowledgment line named INTA, D0 through D7 for communicating the interrupt level or vector offset. Other connections include CAS0 through CAS2 for cascading between 8259s.

Up to eight slave 8259s may be cascaded to a master 8259 to provide up to 64 IRQs. 8259s are cascaded by connecting the INT line of one slave 8259 to the IRQ line of one master 8259.

End of interrupt (EOI) operations support specific EOI, non-specific EOI, and auto-EOI. A specific EOI specifies the IRQ level it is acknowledging in the ISR. A non-specific EOI resets the IRQ level in the ISR. Auto-EOI resets the IRQ level in the ISR immediately after the interrupt is acknowledged.

Edge and level interrupt trigger modes are supported by the 8259A. Fixed priority and rotating priority modes are supported.

The 8259 may be configured to work with an 8080/8085 or an 8086/8088. On the 8086/8088, the interrupt controller will provide an interrupt number on the data bus when an interrupt occurs. The interrupt cycle of the 8080/8085 will issue three bytes on the data bus (corresponding to a CALL instruction in the 8080/8085 instruction set).

The 8259A provides additional functionality compared to the 8259 (in particular buffered mode and level-triggered mode) and is upward compatible with it.

== Programming considerations ==
=== MS-DOS and Windows ===
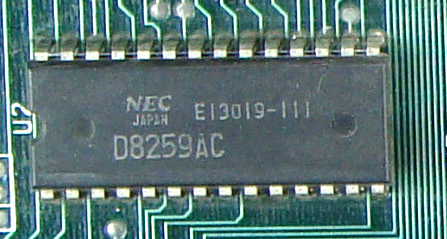
NEC D8259AC, used on the original IBM PC motherboard.

Programming an 8259 in conjunction with MS-DOS and Windows has introduced a number of confusing issues for the sake of backwards compatibility, which extends as far back as the original 1981 IBM PC.

1. MS-DOS device drivers are expected to send a non-specific EOI to the 8259s when they finish servicing their device. This prevents the use of any of the 8259's other EOI, and excludes the differentiation between device interrupts rerouted from the master 8259 to the slave 8259.
2. The use of IRQ2 and IRQ9 from the introduction of a slave 8259 in the IBM PC/AT. The slave 8259's INT output is connected to the master's IR2. The IRQ2 line of the ISA bus, originally connected to this IR2, was rerouted to IR1 of the slave. Thus the old IRQ2 line now generates IRQ9 in the CPU. To allow backwards compatibility with DOS device drivers that still set up for IRQ2, a handler is installed by the BIOS for IRQ9 that redirects interrupts to the original IRQ2 handler.

For IBM PC compatibles, the BIOS maps the master 8259 interrupt requests IRQ0–IRQ7 to interrupts INT 08–INT 0Fh). When present, the IBM PC/AT’s slave 8259 is mapped to interrupt INT 70–INT 77h. This was done despite the first 32 (INT 00-INT 1F) interrupt vectors being reserved by the processor for internal exceptions. This meant that, on later chips, handlers for lower-numbered vectors needed to differentiate between three causes:

1. Faults, exceptions, and traps caused incidentally.
2. Interrupts caused by IRQ or NMI, potentially including spurious IRQs.
3. Deliberate calls from software executing INT, breakpoint, or indirect far CALL/JMP instructions, as might be used to interact with the BIOS, operating system, or device drivers.

Because of this, most operating systems that don’t make use of the BIOS will configure the interrupt controller(s) to avoid the reserved vector range entirely. In protected mode, the OS can restrict use of INT instructions to specific vectors only (e.g., Linux exposes INT 80h for system calls), and any attempt to use a disallowed vector will raise a protection fault.

This avoids some of the need for cause determination in interrupt vector handlers, although spurious interrupts and IRQ-sharing can still complicate matters. Fortunately, most peripheral devices can be queried with regards to outstanding IRQs, and if no source can be found an interrupt can be treated as spurious or ignored altogether.

=== Other operating systems ===
Since most other operating systems allow for changes in device driver expectations, other 8259 modes of operation, such as Auto-EOI, may be used. This is especially important for modern x86 hardware in which a significant amount of time may be spent on I/O address space delay when communicating with the 8259s. This also allows a number of other optimizations in synchronization, such as critical sections, in a multiprocessor x86 system with 8259s.

=== Edge and level triggered modes ===
Since the ISA bus does not support level triggered interrupts, level triggered mode may not be used for interrupts connected to ISA devices. This means that on PC/XT, PC/AT, and compatible systems the 8259 must be programmed for edge triggered mode. On MCA systems, devices use level triggered interrupts and the interrupt controller is hardwired to always work in level triggered mode. On newer EISA, PCI, and later systems the Edge/Level Control Registers (ELCRs) control the mode per IRQ line, effectively making the mode of the 8259 irrelevant for such systems with ISA buses. The ELCR is programmed by the BIOS at system startup for correct operation.

The ELCRs are located 0x4d0 and 0x4d1 in the x86 I/O address space. They are 8-bits wide, each bit corresponding to an IRQ from the 8259s. When a bit is set, the IRQ is in level triggered mode; otherwise, the IRQ is in edge triggered mode.

=== Spurious interrupts ===
The 8259 generates spurious interrupts in response to a number of conditions.

The first is an IRQ line being deasserted before it is acknowledged. This may occur due to noise on the IRQ lines. In edge triggered mode, the noise must maintain the line in the low state for 100 ns. When the noise diminishes, a pull-up resistor returns the IRQ line to high, thus generating a false interrupt. In level triggered mode, the noise may cause a high signal level on the systems INTR line. If the system sends an acknowledgment request, the 8259 has nothing to resolve and thus sends an IRQ7 in response. This first case will generate spurious IRQ7's.

A similar case can occur when the 8259 unmask and the IRQ input de-assertion are not properly synchronized. In many systems, the IRQ input is deasserted by an I/O write, and the processor doesn't wait until the write reaches the I/O device. If the processor continues and unmasks the 8259 IRQ before the IRQ input is deasserted, the 8259 will assert INTR again. By the time the processor recognizes this INTR and issues an acknowledgment to read the IRQ from the 8259, the IRQ input may be deasserted, and the 8259 returns a spurious IRQ7.

The second is the master 8259's IRQ2 is active high when the slave 8259's IRQ lines are inactive on the falling edge of an interrupt acknowledgment. This second case will generate spurious IRQ15's, but is rare.

== PC/XT and PC/AT ==
The PC/XT ISA system had one 8259 controller, while PC/AT and later systems had two 8259 controllers, master and slave. IRQ0 through IRQ7 are the master 8259's interrupt lines, while IRQ8 through IRQ15 are the slave 8259's interrupt lines. The labels on the pins on an 8259 are IR0 through IR7. IRQ0 through IRQ15 are the names of the ISA bus's lines to which the 8259s are attached.

== Variants ==
Model Number	Technology	Temperature Range	Package	Date of Release	Price (USD) (Note: In quantities of 100 and up)
ID8259		-40 °C to +85 °C		March/April 1979	$23.15
M8259		Military		March/April 1979	$95.00
82C59A	CMOS			July/August 1984	
8259			28 Pin PLCC (Note: Sampling Q1 1986)		

== See also ==
- Advanced Programmable Interrupt Controller (APIC)
- IF (x86 flag)
- Interrupt handler
- Interrupt latency
- Non-maskable interrupt (NMI)
