= Double-fault =

The term double-fault can be an adjective referring to:

- double fault (computing), a fault that occurs during processing of another
- double fault (tennis), two consecutive faults during service
