= Dispatch level =

Dispatch level might refer to:

- Dispatch level (electrical generation), a power setting for a load-following or peaker electrical plant.
- DISPATCH_LEVEL, an interrupt level for deferred procedure call in Microsoft Windows.
