= MPIC =

MPIC may refer to:

- Manitoba Public Insurance
- Metro Pacific Investments Corporation
- IBM MultiProcessor Interrupt Controller
- Max Planck Institute for Chemistry
