= PMW (disambiguation) =

PMW frequently refers to the Polish Navy (Polska Marynarka Wojenna).

PMW may also refer to:

- Posted Memory Writes
- Palestine Media Watch
- Palestinian Media Watch
- Palmas Airport, Brazil; IATA airport code PMW
- Paramount Airways, India; ICAO airline code PMW
- Passive microwave sensor (PMW sensor)
- Penmaenmawr railway station, England; National Rail station code PMW
- Philip's Music Writer, a music scorewriter
- Panglima Mahkota Wilayah, a Malaysian award
- "PMW (All I Really Need)", a 2013 song by ASAP Rocky
