= Timer coalescing =

Operating system feature to reduce CPU idle time

Timer coalescing is a computer system energy-saving technique that reduces central processing unit (CPU) power consumption by reducing the precision of software timers used for synchronization of process wake-ups, minimizing the number of times the CPU is forced to perform the relatively power-costly operation of entering and exiting idle states.

== Implementations of timer coalescing ==
- The Linux kernel gained support for deferrable timers in 2.6.22, and controllable "timer slack" for threads in 2.6.28 allowing timer coalescing.
- Timer coalescing has been a feature of Microsoft Windows from Windows 7 onward.
- Apple's XNU kernel based OS X gained support as of OS X Mavericks.
- FreeBSD supports it since September 2010.

== See also ==
- Advanced Configuration and Power Interface (ACPI)
- Advanced Programmable Interrupt Controller (APIC)
- High Precision Event Timer (HPET)
- HLT (x86 instruction)
- Interrupt coalescing
- Programmable interval timer
- Time Stamp Counter (TSC)
