= Deferred Procedure Call =

Microsoft Windows operating system mechanism

A Deferred Procedure Call (DPC) is a Microsoft Windows operating system mechanism which allows high-priority tasks (e.g. an interrupt handler) to defer required but lower-priority tasks for later execution. This permits device drivers and other low-level event consumers to perform the high-priority part of their processing quickly, and schedule non-critical additional processing for execution at a lower priority.

DPCs are implemented by DPC objects which are created and initialized by the kernel when a device driver or some other kernel mode program issues DPC requests. DPC requests are added to the end of a DPC queue. Each processor has a separate DPC queue. DPCs have three priority levels: low, medium, and high. By default, all DPCs are set to medium priority. When Windows drops to an IRQL of Dispatch/DPC level, it checks the DPC queue for any pending DPCs and executes them until the queue is empty or some other interrupt with a higher IRQL occurs.

For example, when the clock interrupt is generated, the clock interrupt handler generally increments the counter of the current thread to calculate the total execution time of that thread, and decrements its quantum time remaining by 1. When the counter drops to zero, the thread scheduler has to be invoked to choose the next thread to be executed on that processor and dispatcher to perform a context switch. Since the clock interrupt occurs at a much higher IRQL, it will be desirable to perform this thread dispatching which is a less critical task at a later time when the processor's IRQL drops. So the clock interrupt handler requests a DPC object and adds it to the end of the DPC queue which will process the dispatching when the processor's IRQL drops to DPC/Dispatch level.

When working with streaming audio or video that uses interrupts, DPCs are used to process the audio in each buffer as they stream in. If another DPC (from a poorly written driver) takes too long and another interrupt generates a new buffer of data, before the first one can be processed, a drop-out results.
