= Tickless kernel =

Type of operating system kernel

A tickless kernel is an operating system kernel in which timer interrupts do not occur at regular intervals, but are only delivered as required.

The Linux kernel on s390 from 2.6.6 and on i386 from release 2.6.21 can be configured to turn the timer tick off (tickless or dynamic tick) for idle CPUs using CONFIG_NO_HZ, and from 3.10 with CONFIG_NO_HZ_IDLE extended for non-idle processors with CONFIG_NO_HZ_FULL. The XNU kernel from Mac OS X 10.4 on, and the NT kernel from Windows 8 on, are also tickless. The Solaris 8 kernel introduced the cyclic subsystem which allows arbitrary resolution timers and tickless operation. FreeBSD 9 introduced a "dynamic tick mode" (a.k.a. tickless).

As of 2020, there is a plan to add this to MINIX 3 in the medium term.
