= Load task register =

Instruction for x86 processors

The LTR x86 instruction stands for load task register and is used in operating systems that support multitasking. LTR is supported only in protected mode and long mode, not in real mode or virtual 8086 mode. It must be executed when the Current Privilege Level (CPL) is 0, and therefore cannot be used by application programs. LTR loads the special x86 task register with a segment selector that points to a task state segment (TSS). After executing the LTR instruction, the TSS pointed to by the argument is marked busy, but no hardware task switch occurs.

The opposite of the LTR instruction is the STR instruction, which means store task register and copies the value of the task register to the specified location. Note that the x86 task register is only accessible directly through the LTR and STR instructions.
