= Double fault =

Type of processor fault

On the x86 architecture, a double fault exception occurs if the processor encounters a problem while trying to service a pending interrupt or exception. An example situation when a double fault would occur is when an interrupt is triggered but the segment in which the interrupt handler resides is invalid. If the processor encounters a problem when calling the double fault handler, a triple fault is generated and the processor shuts down.

As double faults can only happen due to kernel bugs, they are rarely caused by user space programs in a modern protected mode operating system. Other processors like PowerPC or SPARC generally save state to predefined and reserved machine registers. A double fault will then be a situation where another exception happens while the processor is still using the contents of these registers to process the exception. SPARC processors have four levels of such registers, i.e. they have a 4-window register system.

== See also ==
- Triple fault
