= RF distribution amplifier =

A RF distribution amplifier is a high−performance distribution amplifier for analog RF signals. It takes one RF signal and carries it to multiple identical outputs.

== Characteristics ==
- High bandwidth
- RF gain
