= Color killer =

Filtering circuit in TV receivers

The color killer is an electronic stage in color television receiver sets which acts as a cutting circuit to cut off color processing when the TV set receives a monochrome signal.

== Monochromatic transmission ==
When a receiver is tuned to a monochrome transmission, the displayed scene should have no color components. Hardware failure in the color killer stage may cause false color pattern display even during monochrome transmission.

In normal color reception, high frequency luminance is mistaken for color, causing relatively invisible false color patterns. The reason for this invisibility is due to a key feature of NTSC/PAL chroma/luma frequency interleaving, where these false patterns are in complementary colors for adjacent video frames, allowing the human eye to average out the false color patterns. If, during a monochrome transmission, a color killer failure allows color processing activation when it should not, a chroma subcarrier in the color processing stages is regenerated with no reference, giving that subcarrier enough frequency error that the chroma/luminance interleaving feature of NTSC/PAL no longer works, making the false color patterns, overlaying the otherwise monochrome picture, much more visible to the human eye.

Also, when the color killer fails during a monochrome transmission, external noise caused by a weak signal shows up as colored confetti interference.

== Color transmission ==
In a color TV waveform, a reference pulse, called the color burst, (Note: Burst is actually a 10 period color carrier signal.) is transmitted along the back porch portion of the video signal. If the transmitted signal is monochromatic, then the burst is not transmitted. The color killer is actually a muting circuit in the chroma section which supervises the burst and turns off the color processing if no burst is received (i.e. when the received signal is monochromatic.) The main purpose of the color burst in the first place is a reference for the receiver to regenerate the chroma subcarrier, which in turn is utilized to demodulate the color difference signals.

High frequency external interference caused by poor reception conditions causes colored confetti interference overlaying the picture.

== Equation ==
In NTSC and PAL transmissions, the color TV signal can be represented as: (Note: In SECAM, a similar equation can be used except that the modulation system is FM instead of QAM.)

$$E(t) = E_y(t)+ a_1\cdot(E_b(t)-E_y(t))\cdot \sin(\omega t)+ a_2\cdot(E_r(t)-E_y(t))\cdot \cos(\omega t)$$

In this equation $a_1$ and $a_2$ are attenuation factors, $E_y$ is the luminance signal, $(E_b-E_y)$ and $(E_r-E_y)$ are the so-called color difference signals and $\omega$ is the angular frequency of the color carrier. $\omega$ is within the luminance bandwidth.

== Color eraser (Mehikon) ==
In the 1970s, the Israeli government considered the import of color televisions as frivolous and a luxury which would increase social gaps. Therefore, the government ordered the Israel Broadcasting Authority to cease broadcasting in color. As it was impractical to remove the chrominance signal from programs previously recorded in color, this was accomplished by simply omitting the burst phase signal from the broadcast. The "damaged" signal triggered the "color killer" mechanism in color television sets which prevented the appearance of color pictures. This method was named Mehikon (Hebrew: מחיקון "eraser").

Shortly after the introduction of the "Color eraser", special TV sets equipped with Anti-Mehikon (Hebrew: אנטי-מחיקון "anti-eraser") devices were offered. This device re-constructed the burst phase signal according to several known standards. The viewer had to adjust a knob until the picture on the screen appeared in natural colors. According to a report in Yediot Aharonoth from January 1979, viewers had to perform adjustments every 15 minutes on average in normal conditions, or up to 10 times an hour when special problems occurred, in order to restore colors if the picture suddenly turned black and white.

Based on information from owners of appliance stores, the report estimated that 90% of those who purchased color television sets also purchased the Anti-Mehikon device, which added about 5–10% to the price of the television.

Eventually, the Mehikon idea was proven futile, and the Israeli television stopped using it in 1980, allowing freely receivable color transmission.
