= Distribution amplifier =

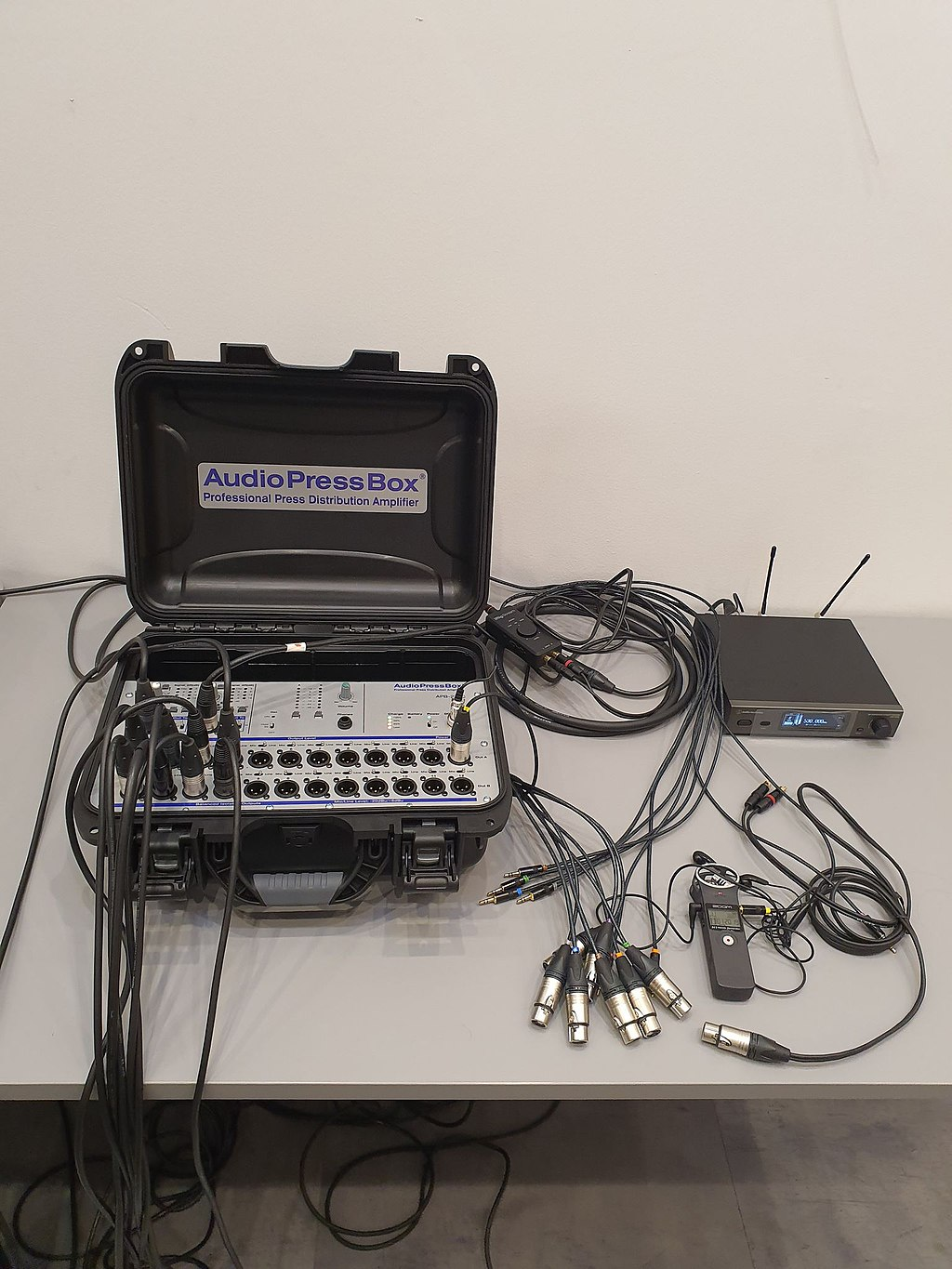
Active Audio Distribution Amplifier AudioPressBox APB-224 C

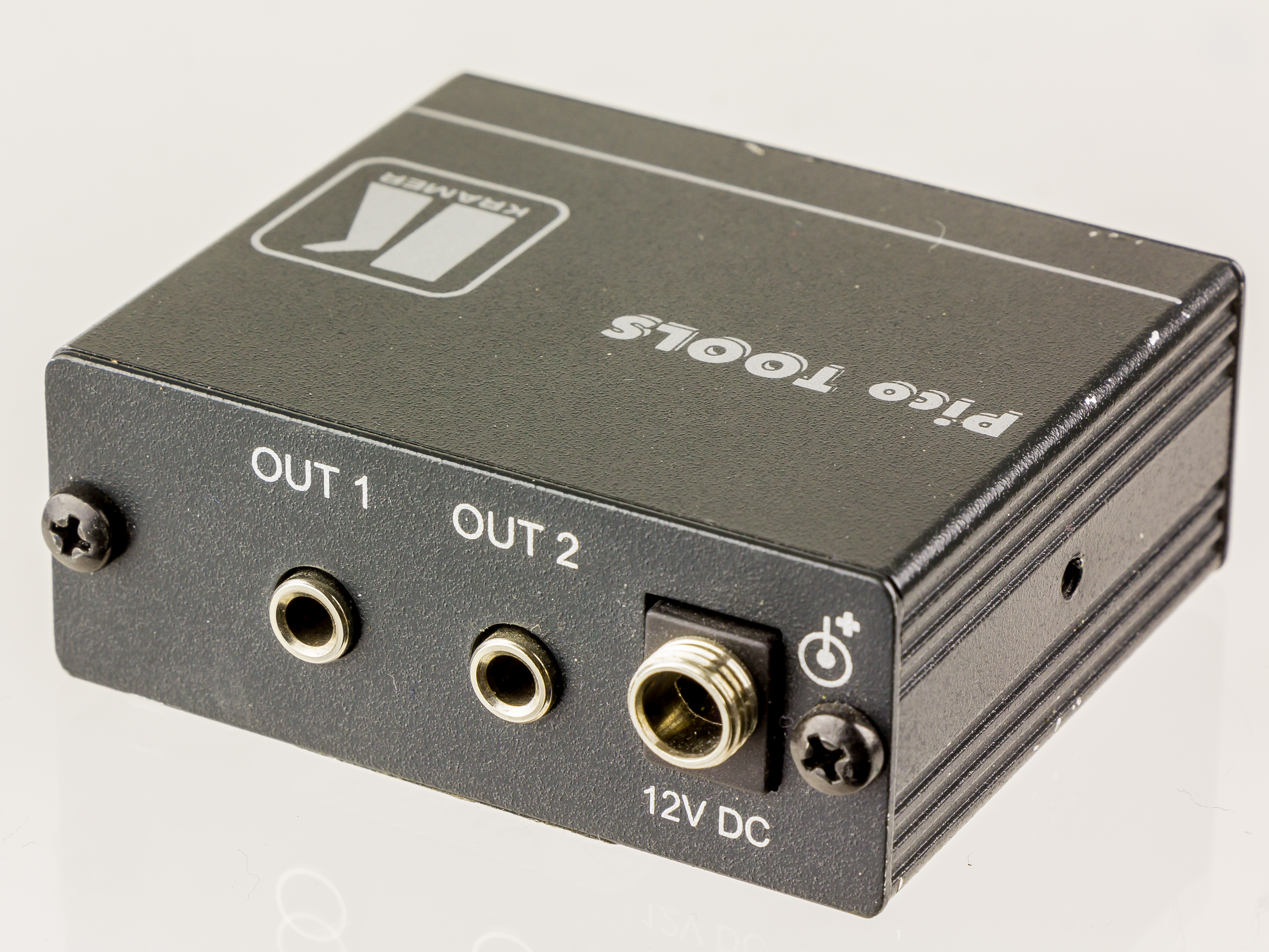
1:2 Stereo Audio Distribution Amplifier - side with output

In electronics, a distribution amplifier, or simply distribution amp or DA, is a device that accepts a single input signal and provides this same signal to multiple isolated outputs.

These devices allow a signal to be distributed to multiple destinations without ground loops or signal degradation. They are used for a number of common engineering tasks, including multiple amplification, cable television, splitting monitor and front of house mixes, and "tapping" a signal prior to sending it through effects units to preserve a "dry" signal for later experimentation.

== Audio distribution amplifier ==
An audio distribution amplifier also known as: a press feed; a pool feed; a media feed; press box; or an ADA, takes a single audio feed, usually a line input, but it may be a microphone input, and outputs multiple line or microphone outputs. This can be done using a passive feed, where the signal is split among the outputs, or as an active feed where the outputs are amplified. The primary use of the Audio Distribution Amplifier is to share a single audio feed with multiple members of the press pool.

== Video distribution amplifier ==
A video distribution amplifier (also known as a distribution amp or VDA) takes a video signal as an input, amplifies it, and outputs the amplified video signal to two or more outputs. It is primarily used to supply a single video signal to multiple pieces of video equipment. It adjusts the amplitude of a video signal to compensate for loss of signal in a video distribution system. Extending the distance of the video signal is the main purpose of the VDA. There are VDAs built for all video formats, NTSC, ATSC, QAM16, QAM32, QAM64, composite video and component video.

Their construction and capabilities can be simple; accept input signal, amplify, then output. Others can be more sophisticated and allow remote control from a control station, allow adjustment of the gain, equalization, and provide status of the input and output signals through Ethernet networks.

== See also ==
- Microphone splitter
